= Timeline of Bursa =

Coordinates: 40.183333°N 29.05°E

The following is a timeline of the history of the city of Bursa, Turkey.

== Prior to 14th century ==
- 183 BCE – Prusa founded by Prusias I of Bithynia.
- 76 BCE – Bithynia becomes part of Roman Empire.
- 720–730 CE – Hagios Stephanos (church) built.
- 947 CE – City besieged by forces of Sayf al-Dawla of Aleppo.
- 1097 – Seljuqs in power (approximate date).
- 1184 – City besieged and plundered by forces of Andronikos I.
- 1204
  - City besieged by French forces led by Pierre de Bracheux and Payen d'Orleans.
  - City becomes part of the Nicaean Empire.

== 14th–18th centuries ==
- 1326 – Siege of Bursa; city becomes capital of Ottoman Empire.
- 1331 – Traveller Ibn Battuta visits city.
- 1335 – Alaeddin Bey Mosque built.
- 1339 – Orhan Camii (mosque) built.
- 1360s - The Ottoman Empire's capital shifts from Bursa to Edirne.
- 1385 - Hüdavendigar Mosque completed.
- 1395 – Bayezid I Mosque built in Yıldırım.
- 1399 – Ulu Cami (mosque) built.
- 1402 – City besieged by Timurids.
- 1413 – City besieged by Karaman forces.
- 1421
  - Yesil Mosque and Yesil Türbe (mausoleum) built.
  - Green Mosque, Bursa built.
- 1424 – Madrasa built.
- 1426 – Muradiye Complex built.
- 1442 – Irgandi Bridge built near city.
- 1487 – Population: 40,000.
- 1490 – Koza Han (caravansary) built.
- 16th C. – Mayor Synagogue (Bursa) built (approximate date).
- 1512 – Ala ed-Din in power.
- 1552 – Yeni Kaplica (bath) built.
- 1607 – City besieged by Kalenderogli.
- 1674 – Inebey Madrasa built in Tahtakale.

== 19th century ==
- 1801 – Fire.
- 1802 – Fire.
- 1804 – Emir Sultan Mosque rebuilt.
- 1814 – Sultan Abdülmecid visits city.
- 1823 – Population: 60,000 (approximate).
- 1845 – Isiklar Military High School established.
- 1852 – Brotte hotel in business.
- 1855 – 28 February: Earthquake.
- 1864 – Gumuslu Kumbet (Silvered Tomb) rebuilt.
- 1869
  - Hamidiye Technical School opens.
  - Bursa newspaper begins publication.
- 1875 – Orphanage founded.
- 1879 – Ahmet Vefik Pasha Theater built.
- 1883 – Egyptians in power.
- 1891 – Mudania-Bursa railway begins operating.

== 20th century ==
- 1902
  - Bursa Archaeological Museum established.
  - The export of silk in 1902 valued at £620,000.
- 1904 - Bursa Museum of Turkish and Islamic Art established.
- 1910 – Population: 75,000.
- 1920 – City taken by Greek forces.
- 1923 – City becomes part of the newly formed Republic of Turkey.
- 1929 - Bursa Museum of Turkish and Islamic Art relocated.
- 1932 – Tayyare theatre opens.
- 1944 – Military airport established.
- 1945 – Ant newspaper begins publication.
- 1949 – Ormancı gazetesi newspaper begins publication.
- 1950
  - Hakimiyet milletindir newspaper begins publication.
  - Population: 103,812.
- 1951 – İşçi sesi newspaper begins publication.
- 1952 – Gece postası newspaper begins publication.
- 1953 – Milletyolu newspaper begins publication (approximate date).
- 1962 – International Bursa Festival begins.
- 1963 – Bursaspor football club formed.
- 1970 – Maarif Koleji (Education College) established.
- 1972 – Archaeological Museum of Bursa opens.
- 1973
  - Atatürk Museum established.
  - Population: 318,209 city; 426,567 urban agglomeration (approximate).
- 1974 – Tofaş Sports Club formed.
- 1975
  - Bursa University established.
  - Turkish and Islamic Works Museum established in the Yesil complex.
- 1979 – Bursa Atatürk Stadium opens.
- 1984 – Population: 535,500 (estimate).
- 1989 - Bursa Forestry Museum opened.
- 1996 – Population: 1,211,688.
- 1998
  - Bursa State Symphony Orchestra founded.
  - Bursa International Fair Building constructed.
- 2000
  - Yenisehir Airport begins operating civilian flights.
  - Borçelik headquarters building constructed.

== 21st century ==
- 2002
  - Bursaray metro transit begins operating.
  - Bursa Book Fair begins (approximate date).
- 2008 – Wholesale Grocer and Fish Market, and Merinos Cultural Centre built.
- 2010 – Bursa Technical University established.
- 2011
  - Bursa Orhangazi University established.
  - Population: 1,704,441.
- 2012 - Bursa Energy Museum established.
- 2016 – 2016 Bursa bombing
- 2017 - Population: 2,936,803 (estimate, urban agglomeration).

== See also ==
- Timelines of other cities in Turkey: Ankara, Istanbul, Izmir

== Bibliography ==
Published in 19th century

- William Hunter (1803), "(Brusa)", Travels through France, Turkey, and Hungary, to Vienna, in 1792 (3rd ed.), London: J. White, OCLC 10321359
- Jedidiah Morse; Richard C. Morse (1823), "Bursa", A New Universal Gazetteer (4th ed.), New Haven: S. Converse
- John Fuller (1830), "(Brusa)", Narrative of a Tour Through Some Parts of the Turkish Empire, John Murray, OCLC 15470157
- John Macgregor (1844). "Trade of Brussa". Commercial Statistics. London: C. Knight and Co.
- George Henry Townsend (1867), "Brusa", A Manual of Dates (2nd ed.), London: Frederick Warne & Co.
- J.T. Bent (1889). "On the Slopes of Olympus". Gentleman's Magazine.
- Vital Cuinet (1894). Vilayet de Brousse. La Turquie d'Asie (in French). Paris: Ernest Leroux.

Published in 20th century

- "Brusa". Guide to Greece, the Archipelago, Constantinople, the Coasts of Asia Minor. London: Macmillan and Co. 1907.
- "Brusa", Handbook for Travellers in Constantinople, Brusa, and the Troad, London: J. Murray, 1907 (+ 1854 ed.)
- Demetrius Coufopoulos (1910), "Brusa", Guide to Constantinople (4th ed.), London: Adam and Charles Black
- "Brusa" . Encyclopædia Britannica. Vol. 4 (11th ed.). 1910. p. 691.
- H. Gerber (1976), "Guilds in Seventeenth Century Bursa", Asian and African Studies
- Murat Çịzakça (1980). "A Short History of the Bursa Silk Industry (1500–1900)". Journal of the Economic and Social History of the Orient. 23.
- Haim Gerber (1980). "Social and Economic Position of Women in an Ottoman City, Bursa, 1600–1700". International Journal of Middle East Studies. 12.
- Halil Sahillioğlu (1985). "Slaves in the social and economic life of Bursa in the late 15th and early 16th centuries". Turcica.
- Haim Gerber (1988). Economy and Society in an Ottoman City: Bursa, 1600–1700. Jerusalem: Hebrew University.
- "Turkey: Bursa", Middle East, Lonely Planet, 1994, p. 633+, OL 16516298W
- E. Broadrup (1995). "Bursa, Turkey". International Dictionary of Historic Places. Chicago: Fitzroy Dearborn. p. 105.
- Aptullah Kuran (1996). "A Spatial Study of Three Ottoman Capitals: Bursa, Edirne, and Istanbul". Muqarnas. 13. Cambridge, Massachusetts.
- "Northwestern Turkey: Bursa". Greece & Turkey. Let's Go. 1996. p. 453+. ISBN 9780312135447.

Published in 21st century

- Suraiya Faroqhi (2008). "At the Ottoman Empire's Industrious Core: the Story of Bursa". The City in the Islamic World. Leiden: Koninklijke Brill. p. 357+.
- Bruce E. Stanley; Michael R.T. Dumper, eds. (2008), "Bursa", Cities of the Middle East and North Africa, Santa Barbara, USA: ABC-CLIO, p. 100
- Gabor Agoston; Bruce Alan Masters (2009). "Bursa". Encyclopedia of the Ottoman Empire. Facts on File. ISBN 978-1-4381-1025-7.
- "Bursa". Grove Encyclopedia of Islamic Art & Architecture. Oxford University Press. 2009. p. 317.
