= Hüdavendigar Mosque =

Mosque in Bursa, Turkey

- Hüdavendigar Camii
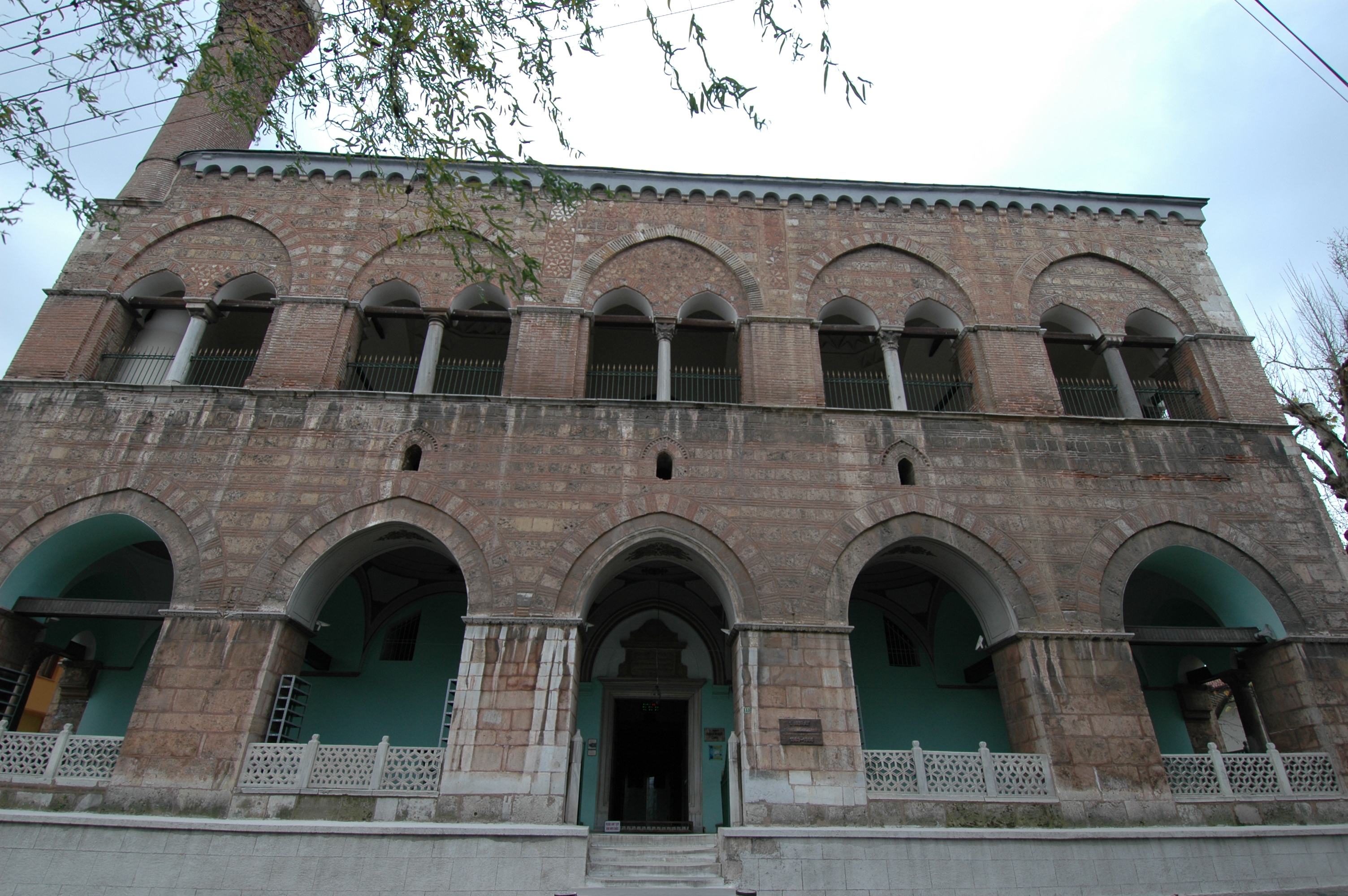

- Location of the mosque in Turkey

Religion
- Affiliation: Islam

Location
- Location: Bursa, Turkey
- Coordinates: 40°12′08″N 29°01′15″E

Architecture
- Type: Mosque
- Style: Islamic, Ottoman architecture
- Groundbreaking: 1365
- Completed: 1385; 641 years ago
- Minaret: 1
- Location within Turkey

UNESCO World Heritage Site
- Part of: Bursa and Cumalıkızık: the Birth of the Ottoman Empire
- Criteria: Cultural: (i), (ii), (iv), (vi)
- Reference: 1452-003
- Inscription: 2014 (38th Session)

Hüdavendigar Mosque or Murat I, the Hüdavendigar Mosque (Turkish: Hüdavendigar Camii or 1. Murat Hüdavendigar Camii) is a historic mosque in Bursa, Turkey, that is part of the large complex (külliye) built by the Ottoman Sultan, Murad I, between 1365–1385 and is also named after the same sultan. It went under extensive renovation following the 1855 Bursa earthquake.

== Architecture ==
The mosque has a reversed T-plan and the Külliye further consists of a Madrasa) and dervish lodge (zaviye), mausoleum Türbe, fountain, a soup kitchen Imaret, a hamam and a Koran school for boys (sibyan mektebi).

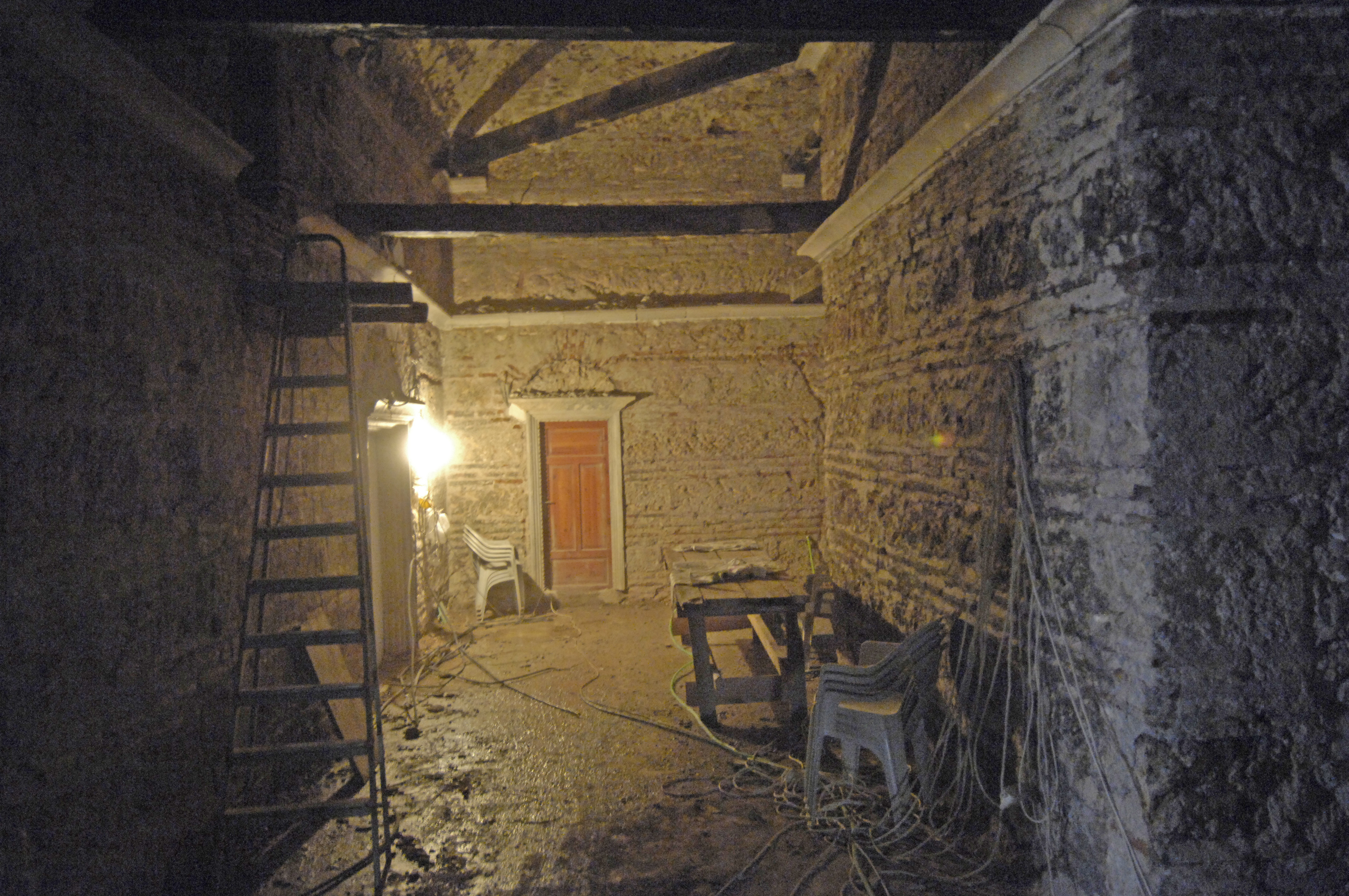
Interior during restoration

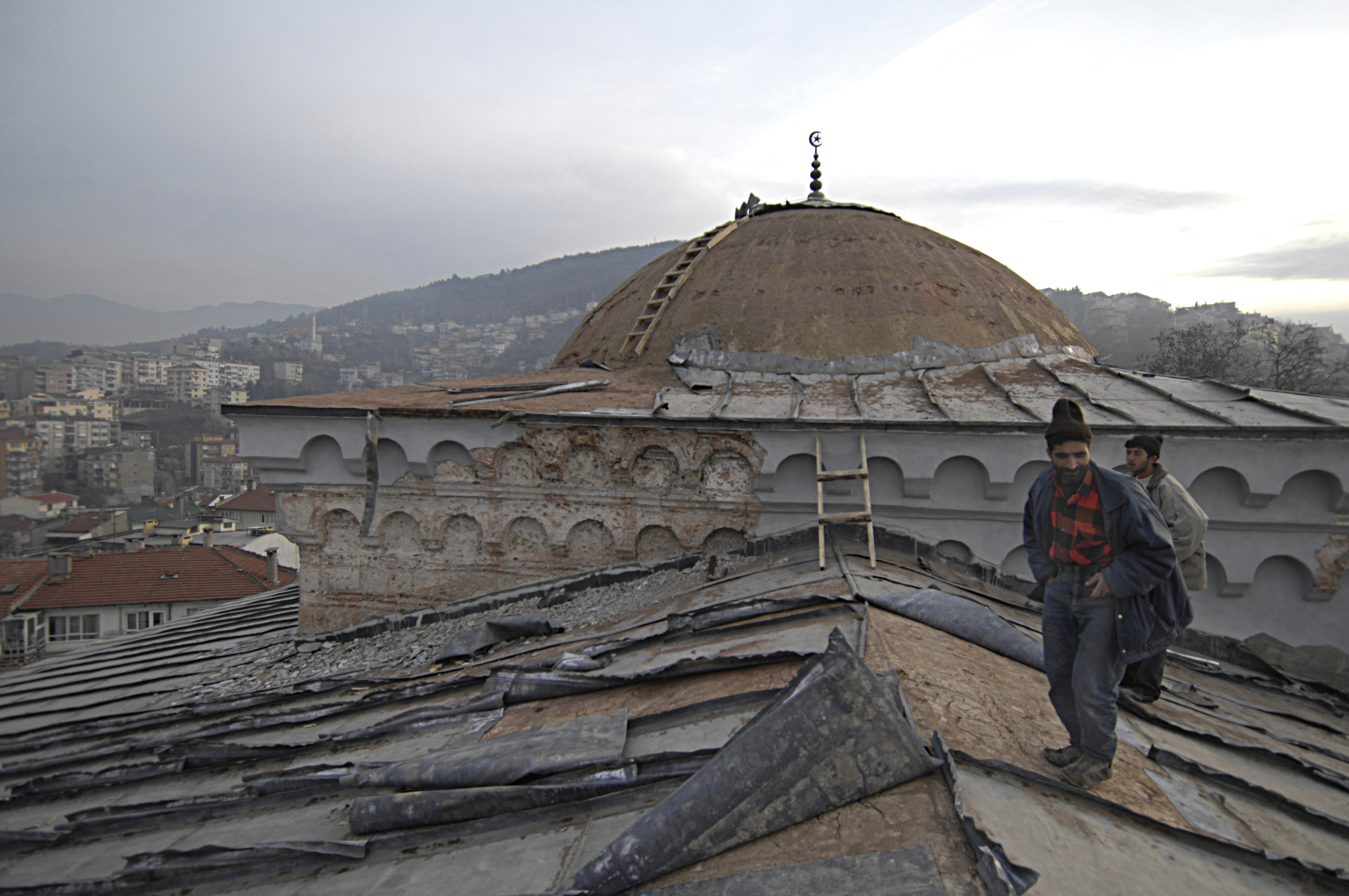
On the roof that was being re-leaded during restoration

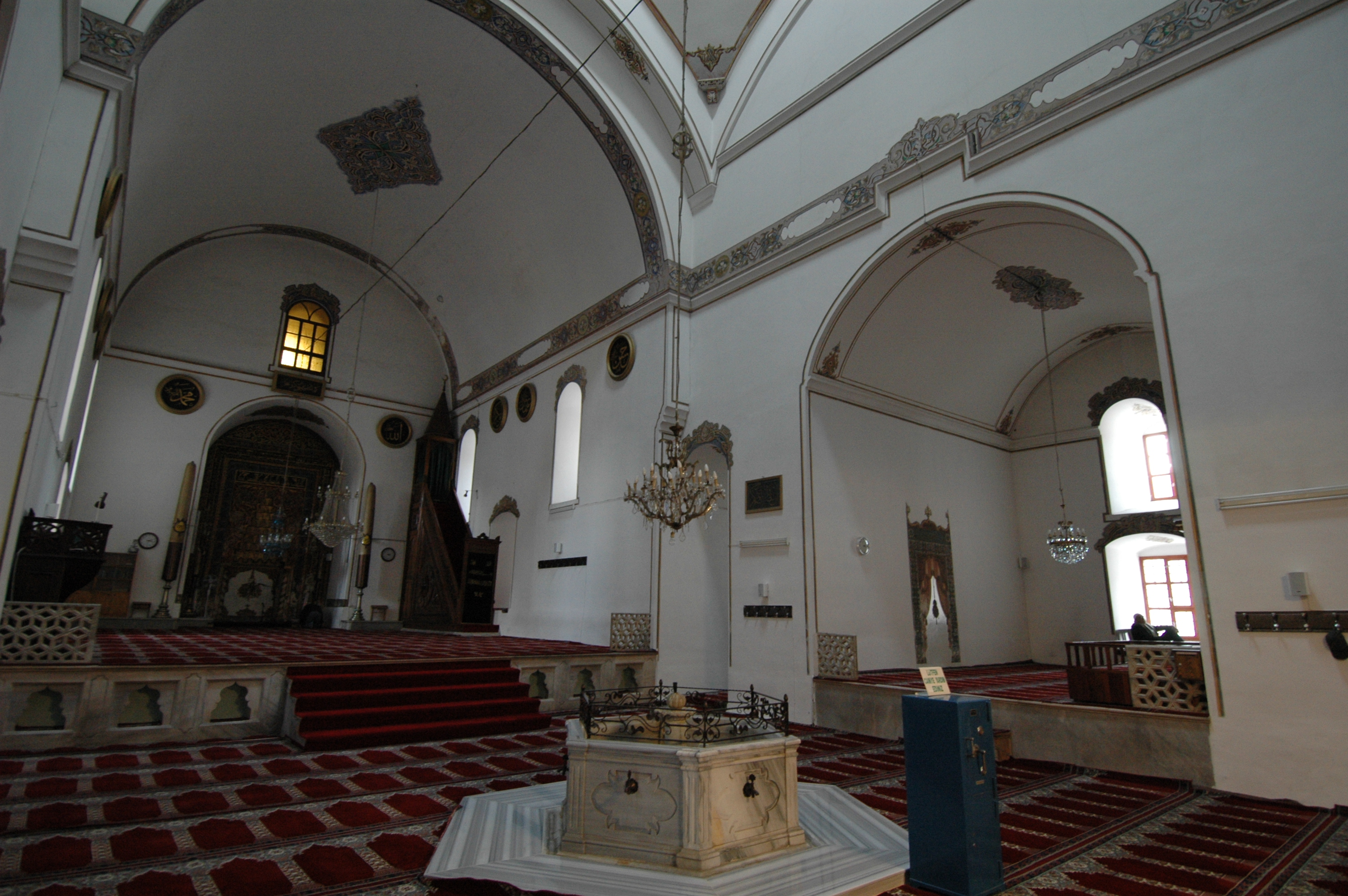
Interior

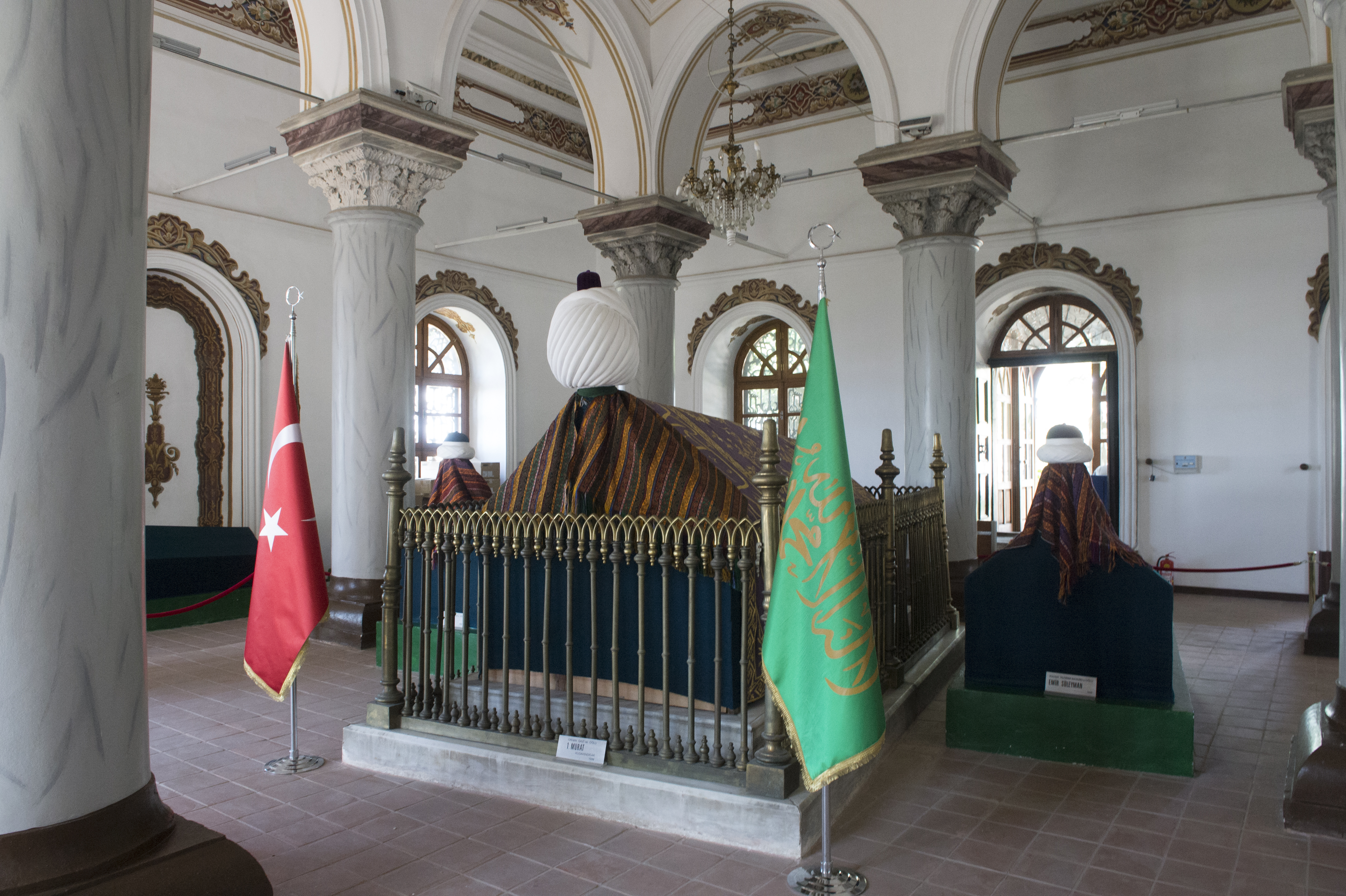
Mausoleum of Murat I
