= Fatih Mosque, Tirilye =

Mosque and former Byzantine church

Fatih Mosque
- Fatih Camii
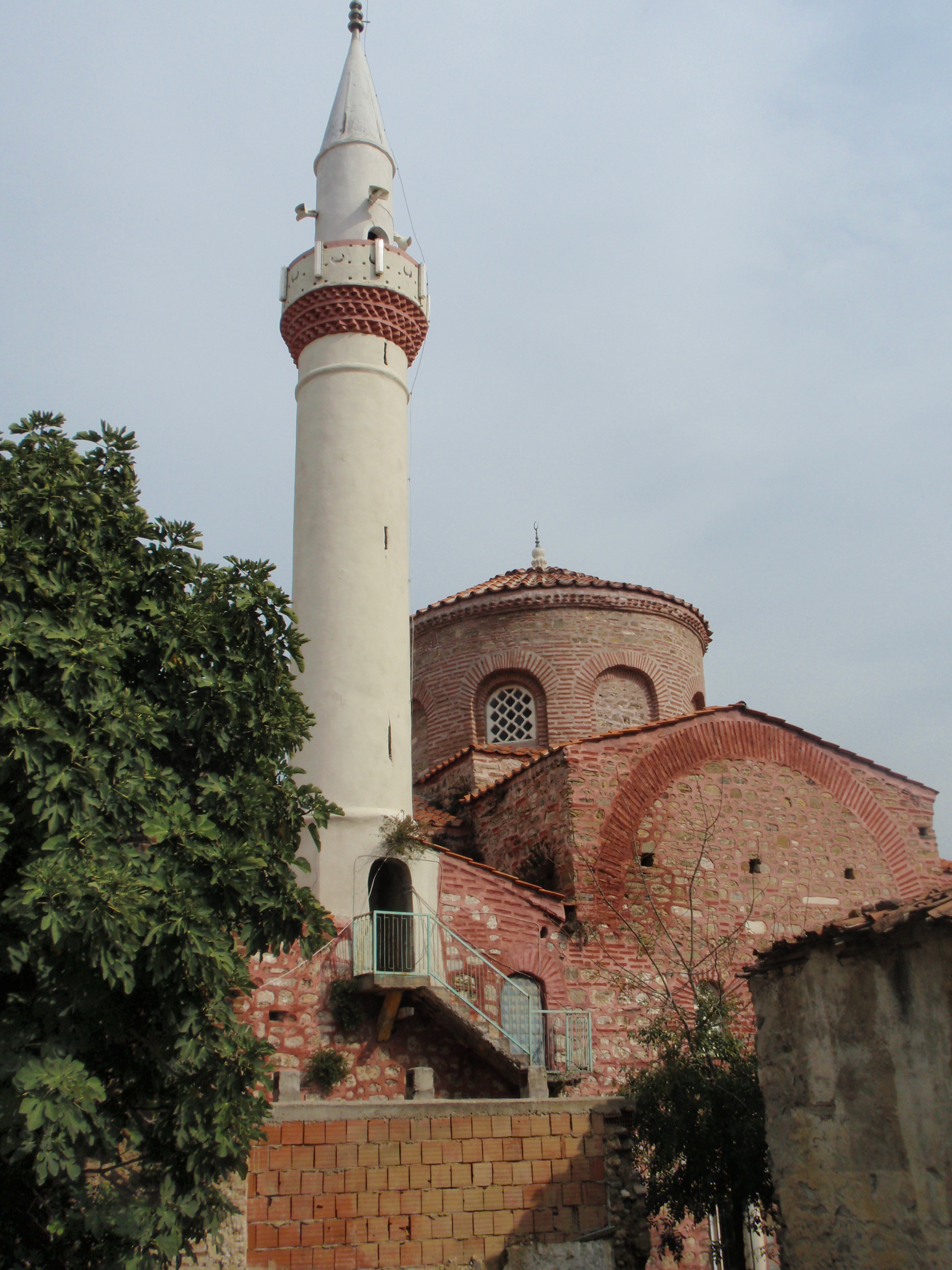

- Turkey

Religion
- Affiliation: Sunni Islam

Location
- Location: Tirilye, Bursa, Turkey
- Interactive map of Fatih Mosque
- Coordinates: 40.393078°N 28.796799°E

Architecture
- Type: Mosque
- Groundbreaking: 720
- Completed: 730

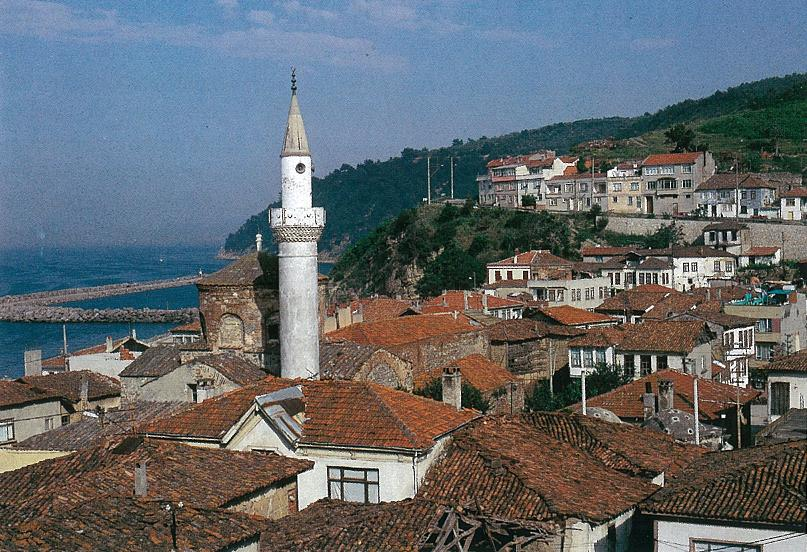
Fatih Mosque 1990

The Fatih Mosque (Turkish: Fatih Camii) is a mosque in Tirilye (Zeytinbağı), Bursa Province, Turkey. The structure was originally constructed in the 8th or 9th as a Byzantine church and was later converted to a Muslim place of worship during the 16th century. It again served as a Greek Orthodox church between 1920 and 1922 until it was re-converted to a mosque in 1923 after the Greco-Turkish population exchange.

== History ==
The original structure may have been erected between 720 and 730 (or possibly in the early 9th century, according to Robert Ousterhout) and was most likely known as either the Church of Christ and Saint Stephen the Confessor - often referred to simply as the Church of Saint Stephen at Trigleia - or the Church of Saint Theodore. There is some evidence that the site church was associated with a monastery, which Cyril Mango and Ihor Ševčenko identify as the Trigleia Monastery (Greek: Moni Trigleias), though others have suggested instead that it was affiliated with the Chinolakkos Monastery (Moni tou Chinolakkou).

Following the Ottoman conquest of Anatolia, the Byzantine church was converted to a mosque and re-named Fatih Camii (Turkish: "Mosque of the Conqueror"). Later during the Greek Summer Offensive of 1920, Bursa was briefly occupied by Greek forces and the mosque was briefly re-dedicated as an Orthodox church. In 1923, the site was once again converted to a mosque.

== Description ==
The structure is thought to be the oldest surviving Byzantine building in the region, and has protected status. It also constitutes one of the oldest known examples of a Byzantine cross-in-square church and in its early years the building incorporated a south chapel that was later destroyed. The main entrance to the mosque is through a portico covered with a wooden roof which is standing on four columns that have ornamented metal headings. The structure's central dome, which sits upon a cylindrical tholobate pierced with eight windows, rises 19 metres (62 ft.) high and is approximately 4.5 metres (14.75 ft.) wide . Although the church was constructed sometime around the 8th century, it incorporated earlier elements such as 6th century sculptures, some of which may have been re-carved at a later date. Some scholars have speculated that the church was also decorated with paintings and icons, though these no longer survive.

After the site's conversion to a mosque, a tall tiled mihrab covered with a half-dome was set into the building's central apse where the former church's bema (altar) once stood. A minaret was also added to the structure, though this was badly damaged in an earthquake in 1855 and has subsequently been rebuilt.

== See also ==
- Cross-in-square Churches
- Ancient Roman and Byzantine domes

== Sources ==
- Brubaker, Leslie and John Haldon. Byzantium in the Iconoclast Era (ca. 680-850): The Sources - An Annotated Survey. Aldershot: Ashgate, 2011
- Buchwald, Hans Herbert. Form, Style, and Meaning in Byzantine Church Architecture. Ann Arbor: University of Michigan Press, 1999
- Cormack, Robin. Byzantine Art. Oxford: Oxford University Press, 2018
- Hayden, Robert, Hande Sözer, Tuğba Tanyeri-Erdemir, and Aylan Erdemir. "The Byzantine Mosque at Trilye: A Processual Analysis of Dominance, Sharing, Transformation and Tolerance." History and Anthropology, vol. 22, no. 1 (2011): 1-17
- Hasluck, F. W. "Bythinica." Annual of the British School at Athens, vol. 13 (1906/7): 285-308
- Mango, Cyril and Ihor Ševčenko. "Some Churches and Monasteries on the South Shore of the Sea of Marmara." Dumbarton Oaks Papers, vol. 18 (1973): 235-77
- Marinis, Vasileios. Architecture and Ritual in the Churches of Constantinople: Ninth to Fifteenth Centuries. Cambridge: Cambridge University Press, 2014
- Ousterhout, Robert. Eastern Medieval Architecture: The Building Tradition of Byzantium and Neighbouring Lands. Oxford: Oxford University Press, 2019
- Ousterhout, Robert. Master Builders of Byzantium. Philadelphia: University of Pennsylvania Press, 2008
