= Green Mosque, Bursa =

Mosque in Bursa, Turkey

Green Mosque
- Yeşil Camii
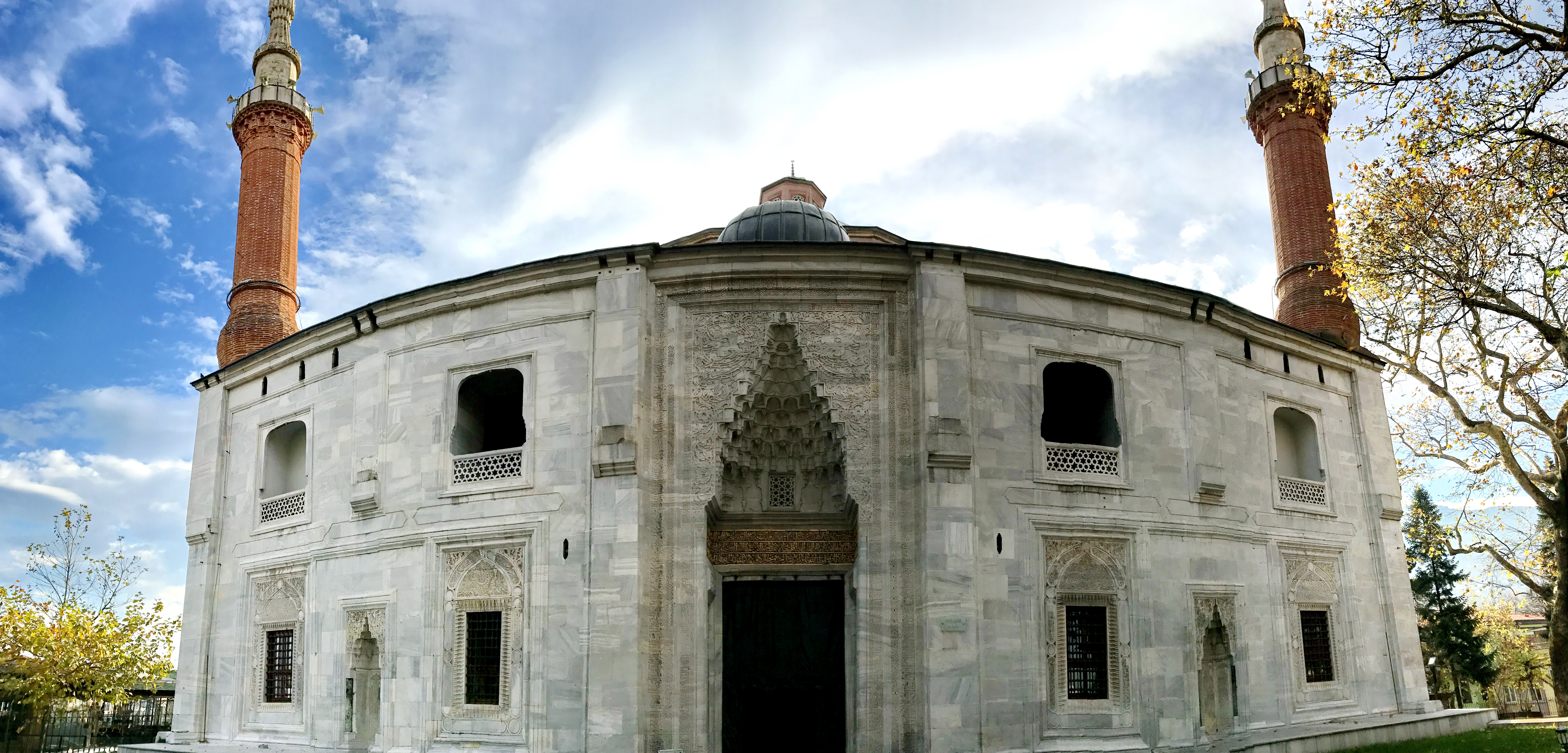

- Location of the mosque in Turkey

Religion
- Affiliation: Islam

Location
- Location: Bursa, Turkey
- Coordinates: 40°10′55″N 29°04′28″E

Architecture
- Architect: Hacı İvaz Pasha
- Type: Mosque
- Style: Islamic, Ottoman architecture
- Groundbreaking: 1412
- Completed: 1424; 602 years ago
- Minaret: 2
- Location within Turkey

UNESCO World Heritage Site
- Part of: Bursa and Cumalıkızık: the Birth of the Ottoman Empire
- Criteria: Cultural: (i), (ii), (iv), (vi)
- Reference: 1452-006
- Inscription: 2014 (38th Session)

The Green Mosque (Turkish: Yeşil Camii), also known as the Mosque of Mehmed I, is a part of a larger complex (külliye) in eastern Bursa, Turkey, the former capital of the Ottoman Turks before Constantinople was captured in 1453. The complex consists of a mosque, a mausoleum known as the Green Tomb, a madrasa, a public kitchen, and a bathhouse. The name Green Mosque comes from its green and blue interior tile decorations. It is part of the historic UNESCO World Heritage Site.

== History ==
=== Construction ===
The Green Mosque is often seen as the culmination of the early Ottoman architectural style, mainly due to the level of aesthetic and technical mastery displayed within the mosque.

The Green Mosque was commissioned by Sultan Mehmed I Çelebi, who ruled from 1413 to 1421, after a fight against his brothers to reunite the Ottoman Empire. The mosque's construction was begun in 1412 and, according to the inscription over its entrance portal, it was completed in December 1419 or January 1420 (Dhu'l-Hijja 822 AH). Construction was supervised by architect and patron of the arts vizier Hacı İvaz Pasha, who had been a commander under Mehmed I. Upon his death, Mehmed I was buried in a mausoleum called the Green Tomb, commissioned by his son and successor, Murad II, located within the complex. Construction of the tomb was completed in May 1421.

Decorative work continued on the mosque after Mehmed I's death. A calligraphic inscription in the sultan's loge above the entrance records that the decoration was completed in August 1424 (at the end of Ramadan 827) by Nakkas ("the Artist") Ali bin Ilyas Ali. Ali bin Ilyas Ali is believed to have brought a diverse group of craftsmen called the “Masters of Tabriz” to assist him. This is based on an inscription on the tiles around the mosque's mihrab which is signed as the "work of the masters of Tabriz". Tabriz, a prominent artistic and cultural center in western Iran, was a particularly important channel through which Timurid influence arrived at the Green Mosque, as it was invaded by the Timurids throughout the fourteenth and fifteenth centuries. Hacı İvaz Pasha was also reported to have “brought masters and men of skill from foreign lands” to help with the mosque's construction, according to 15th-century historian Aşıkpaşazade. Another Persian inscription inside the royal loge above the entrance identifies Mehmed el-Mecnun ("Mehmet the Mad") as the artist who decorated the ceramics of the mosque. Scholar Patricia Blessing notes that the exact roles played by each person named in the inscriptions is still not certain, as the terminology used in these historical texts is not fully understood today.

=== Restorations ===
Due to the damage sustained in the 7.5 magnitude Bursa earthquake of 1855, the complex underwent extensive renovations planned by French architect and artist Léon Parvillée, beginning in 1863. The exact completion date is unknown. Ahmet Vefik Paşa, the regional administrator of west Anatolia and a patron of the preservation of Ottoman cultural heritage, asked Parvillée to restore the major fourteenth and fifteenth century royal monuments of the city. During this period, Bursa was undergoing a transformation into a modern city.

Parvillée first visited the Ottoman capital of Istanbul in 1851, later moving there in 1855. He worked in the empire as a decorator, contractor and architect. Parvillée was well-versed in the main aspects of early Ottoman style due to his experiences living and working in the region as well as his extensive research of the subject. The French consul of Bursa stated in 1906 that Parvillée remained in Bursa from 1862 to 1867, but this is disputed. It is unclear whether Parvillée merely planned the restoration and then left Bursa, or stayed to supervise the execution of his specifications. In any case, it is documented that Parvillée had returned to Paris by 1867 to design and build the Turkish pavilion displayed in the Exposition Universelle.

Parvillée was involved in restoring the interior and the exterior of the mosque, including the tile work. Parvillée restored the black-line tiles on the portal of the mosque. The two minarets were rebuilt on an old base by Parvillée. Polychrome painted decorations, which had previously adorned the upper parts of the walls and ceilings, were not restored.

During a second restoration project that took place from 1941 to 1943, the ceramic facing of the tiles was removed and reinstalled.

The Green Mosque underwent another renovation, starting in 2010 and reopening on May 11, 2012, which cost 1.8 million Turkish Liras.

=== Present day ===
The Green Mosque is now a popular tourist destination in Bursa. Since 2014 it is part of the UNESCO World Heritage Site designated around historic Bursa.

== Architecture ==
=== Interior ===
Video: Green Mosque of Bursa, 2017

The Green Mosque is based on an inverted T-plan and is a two-story, cube-shaped building with an extension on the south side. The mosque has a vestibule at the entrance leading up a short staircase to a central prayer hall. This stairway has four marble cubby-holes (Turkish: papuçluk) on each side for slippers. These architectural inclusions point to the court being paved previously, although it is now carpeted.

The central hall, which runs from north to south, is flanked by iwans (Turkish: eyvans) on the east and west. Both are domed and two stories high. There are two doors, smaller iwans, connecting to corner rooms on the first floor that are similar to those on the north side of the building, each containing a fireplace. The central hallway running north–south is intersected by a longer hallway running east–west.

Within the central hallway, the main hall contains an octagonal, white marble fountain with a pool beneath the central dome—the highest dome in the mosque—which is illuminated by a lantern overhead. On either side of the pool, two further iwans lead to rooms for traveling dervishes, while a higher raised iwan directly behind the water (when seen from the central hall's entrance) leads to the prayer hall itself. In this iwan, there is a mihrab niche on the south (qibla) side of the mosque, as well as two sets of four windows.

Immediately past the entrance of the Green Mosque lies a foyer. From here, wide corridors, framed by Byzantine columns, extend in both directions, ending in staircases leading to the royal chambers. These corner rooms overlook the interior court, and connect to yet another small room leading to the royal box, which effectively functions as another iwan. These chambers contain the winding stairways leading up to the lofts. Between these corner rooms, a passage opens to the balconies on the northern façade where the minaret steps begin. The two minarets opposite from each other on the north facade were later additions. A porch was designed but never built.

Interior features

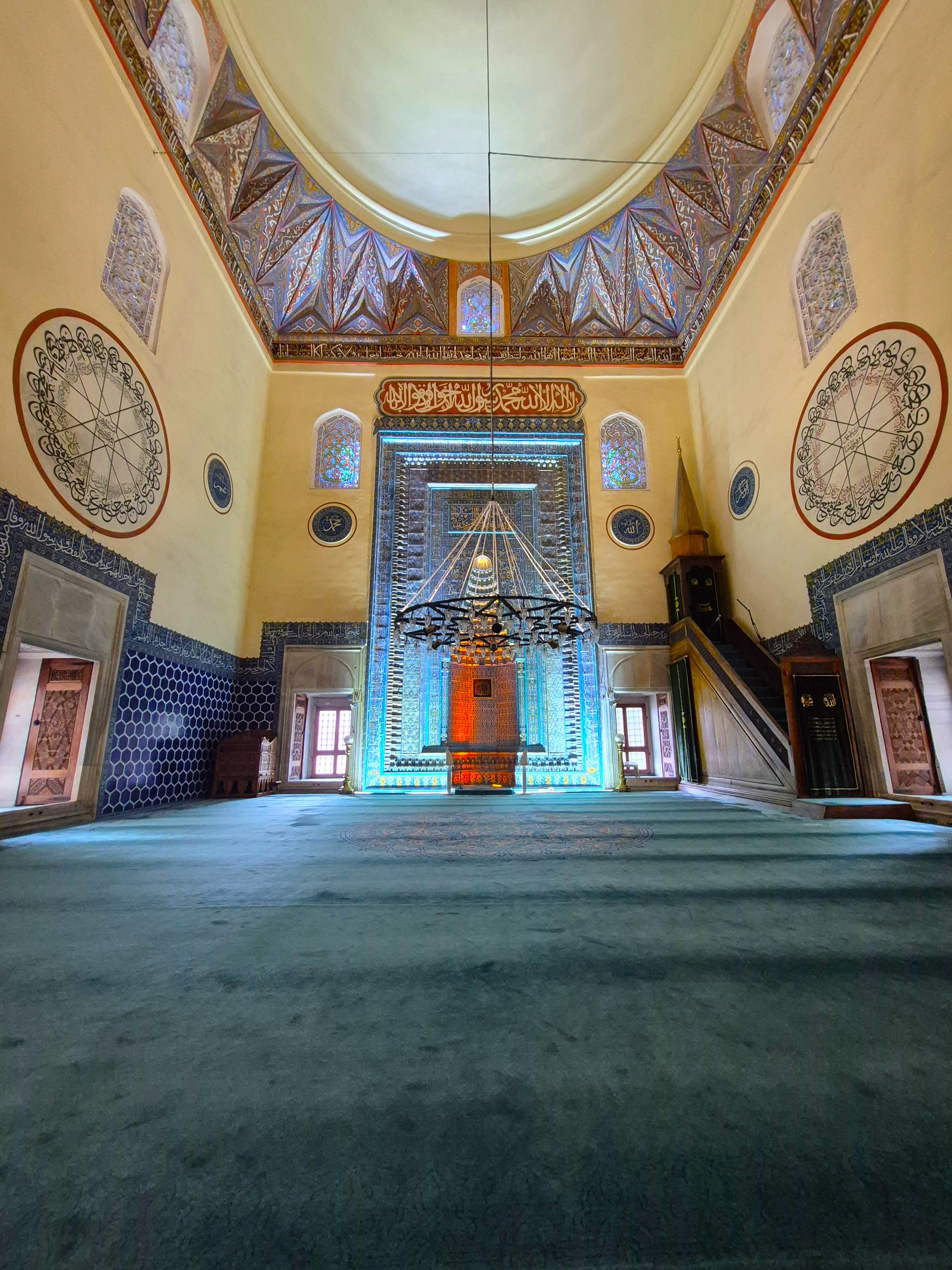
The prayer hall of the mosque

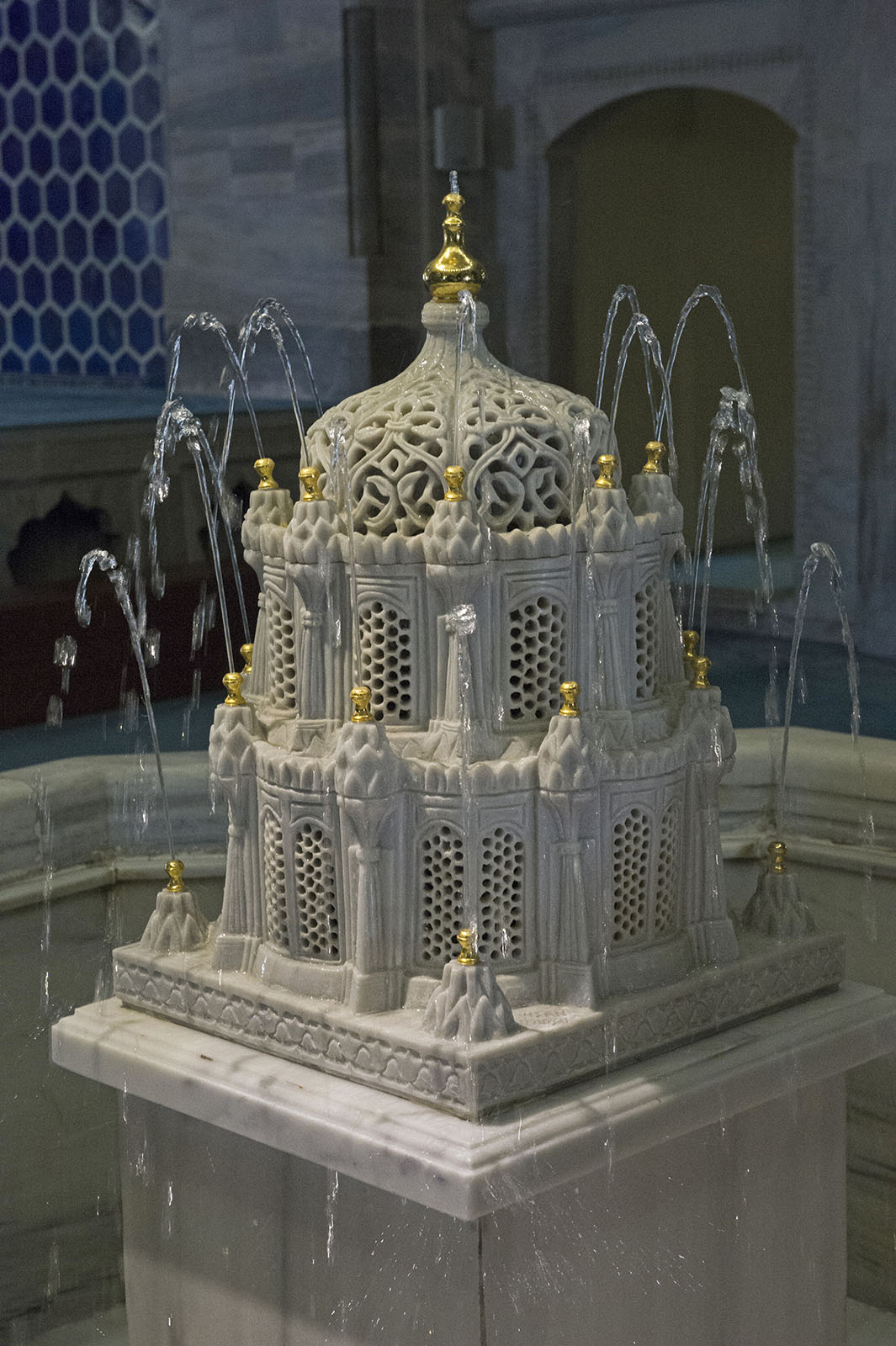
The marble fountain within an octagonal pool in the prayer hall

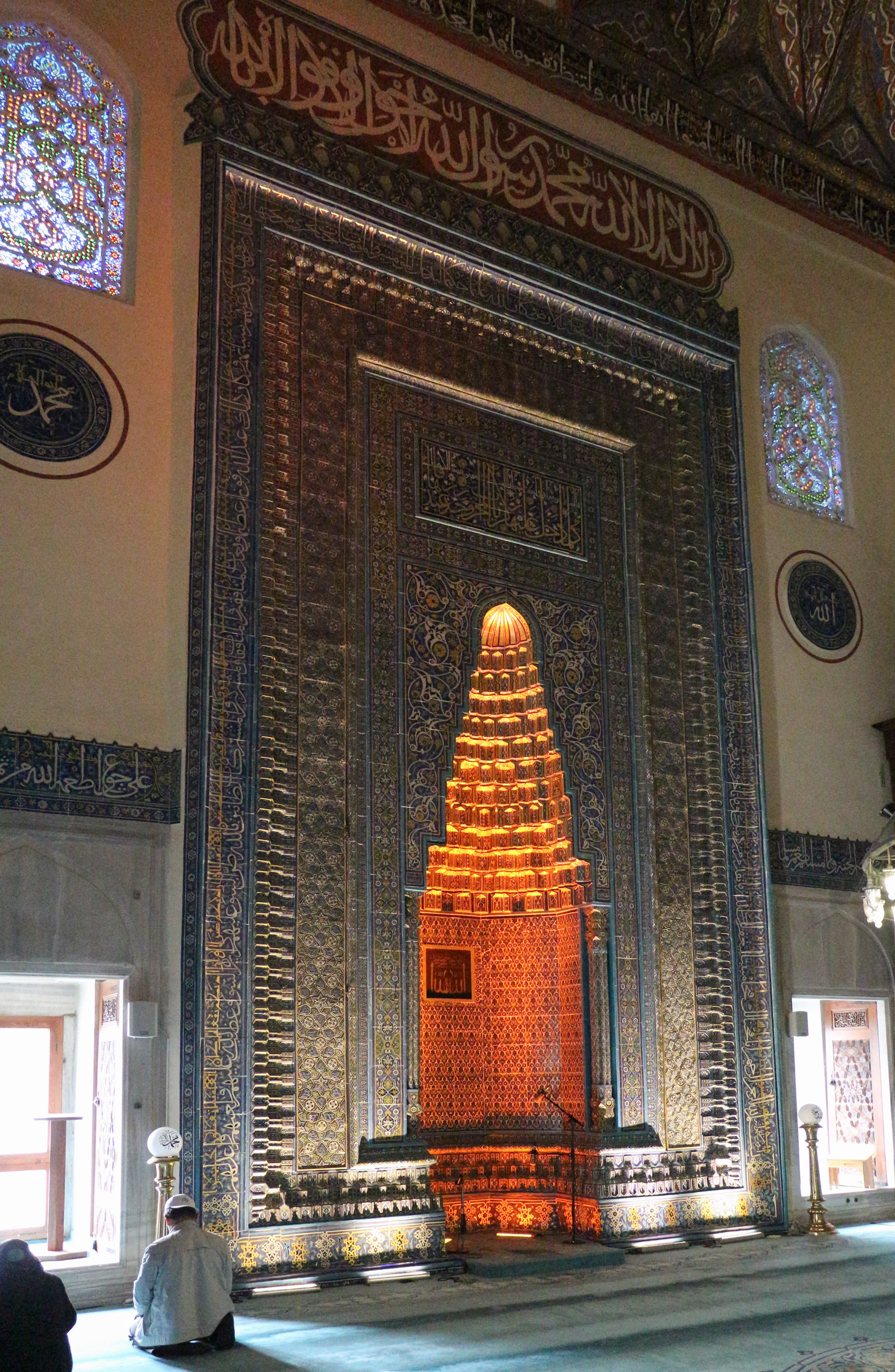
The mihrab of the mosque. Above the mihrab is an inscription in Persian, reading amal-i ustādhān-i Tabrīz ("work of the masters of Tabriz").

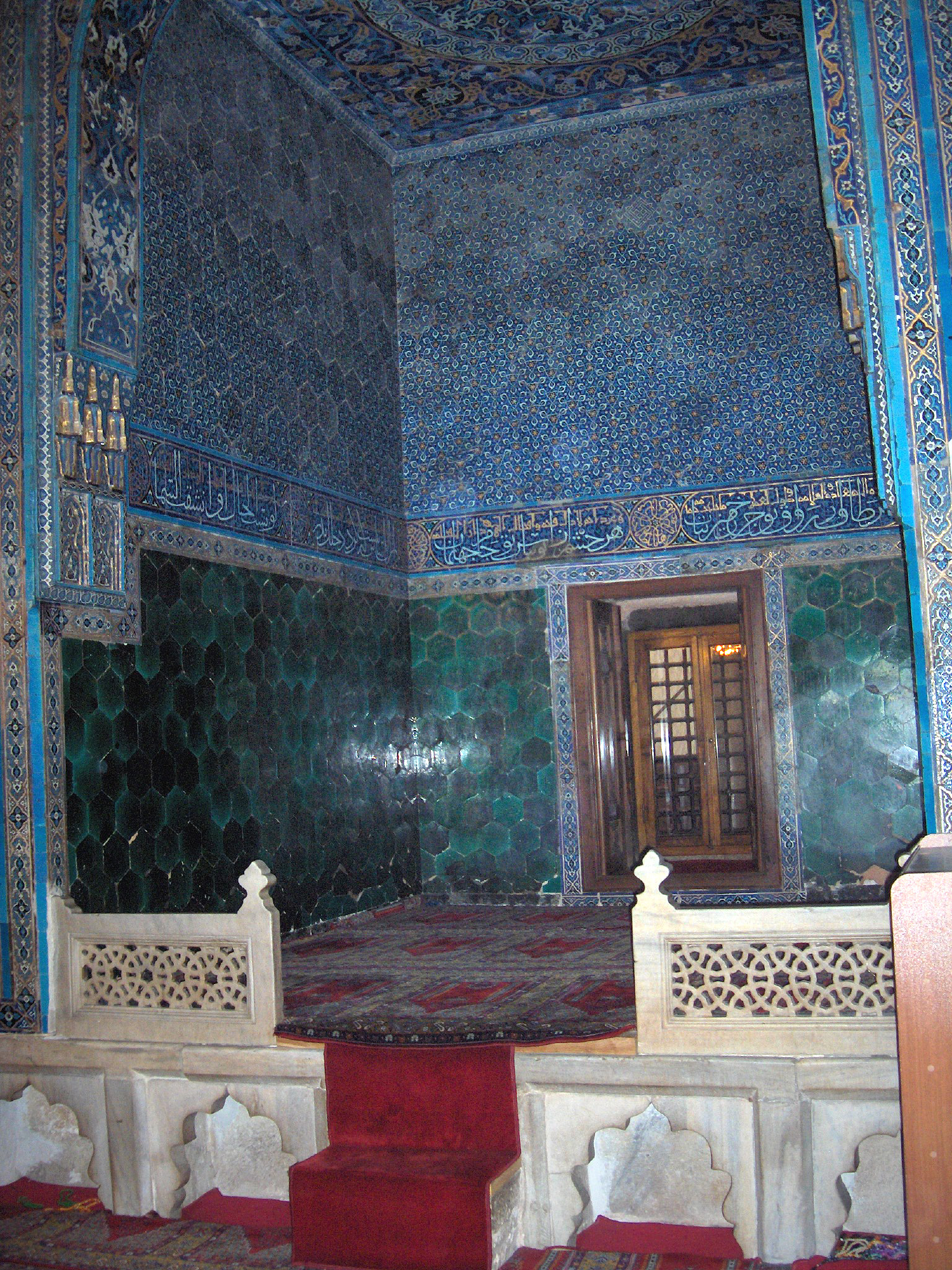
One of the mahfils that flank the opening to the prayer hall

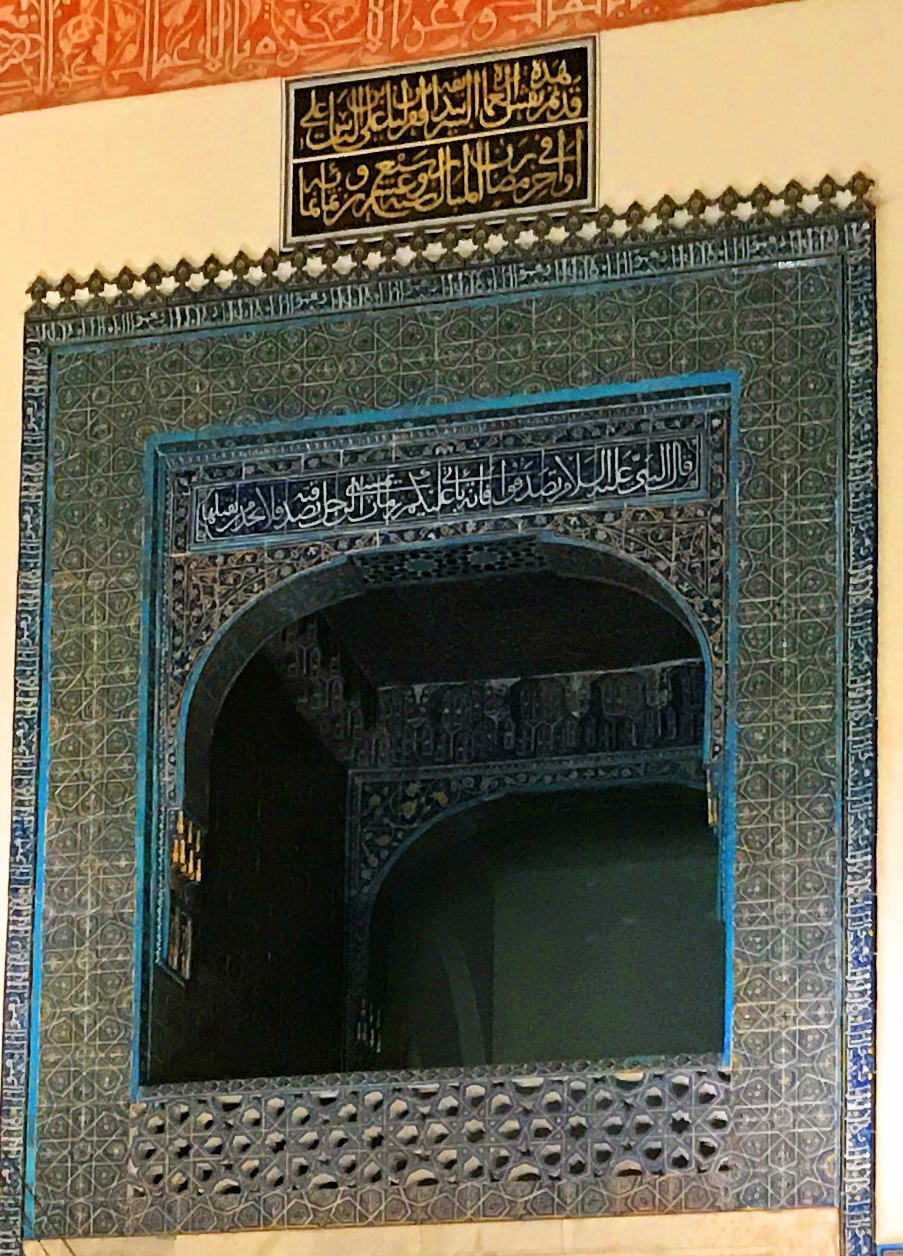
The opening to the second-floor sultan's loge, as seen from the prayer hall

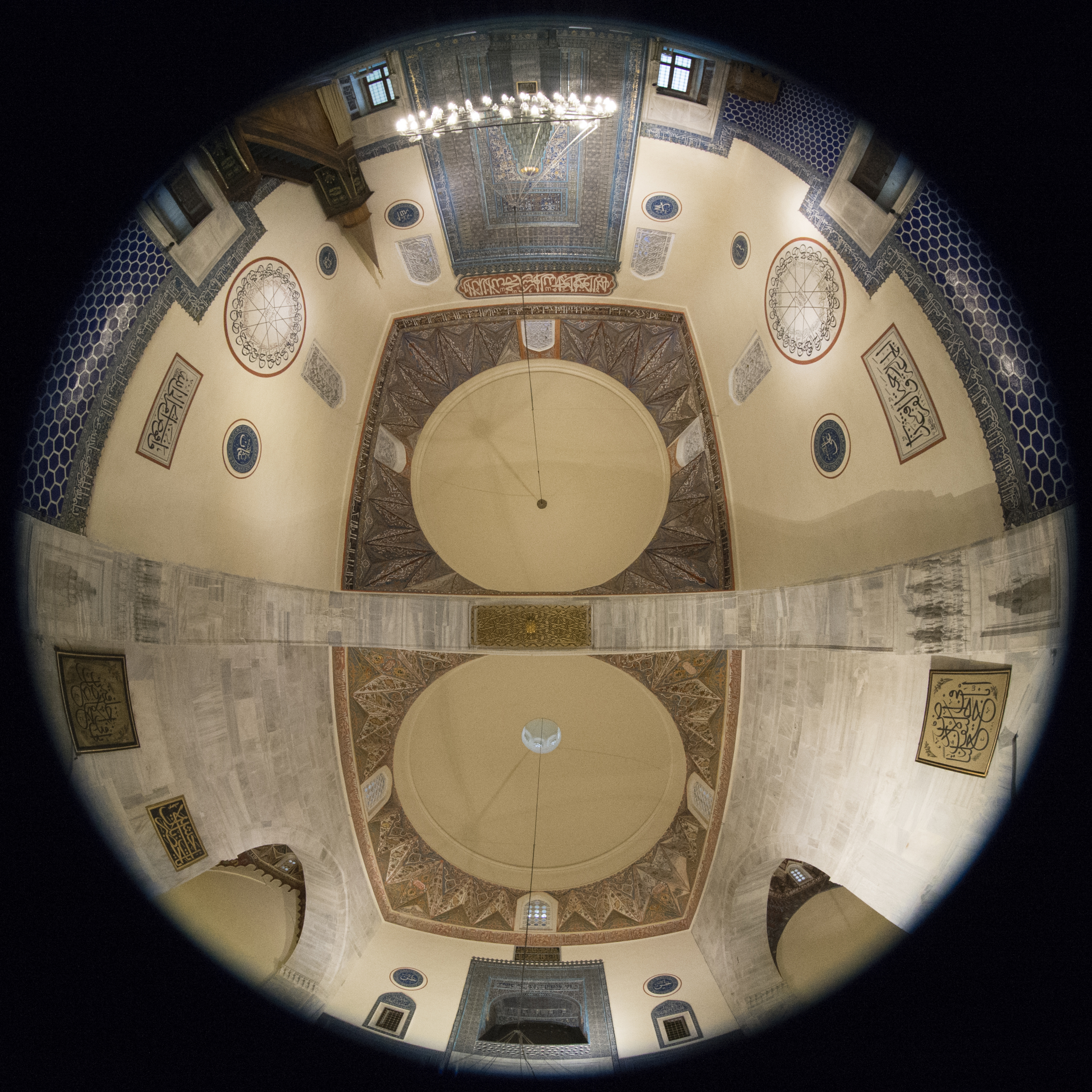
Fish-eye view of the domes

=== Exterior ===
Marble panels, a majority of which were replaced in the nineteenth century, overlay the mosque's edifice of hewn sandstone. The door is crowned by a half-dome with a cascade of muqarnas, whose face is covered with arabesques and Rumi inscriptions. Above the niches on each side of the entrance door is an inscription dedicated to Hacı İvaz Pasha, the mosque's designer. Between the inscription and the muqarnas is a small window that illuminates the path to the sultan's box.

The domes on top of the building were originally covered by blue and green tiles but are now clad in lead. There are windows pierced into drums in the domes and on the exterior walls. An oculus above the ablution basin in the central hall was enclosed with a lantern at the time of restoration.

The two minarets were fitted with stone spires, carved in the baroque manner, at the time of renovation. They can only be accessed through the sultan's apartments and by climbing up the winding stairs to the attics.

Exterior features

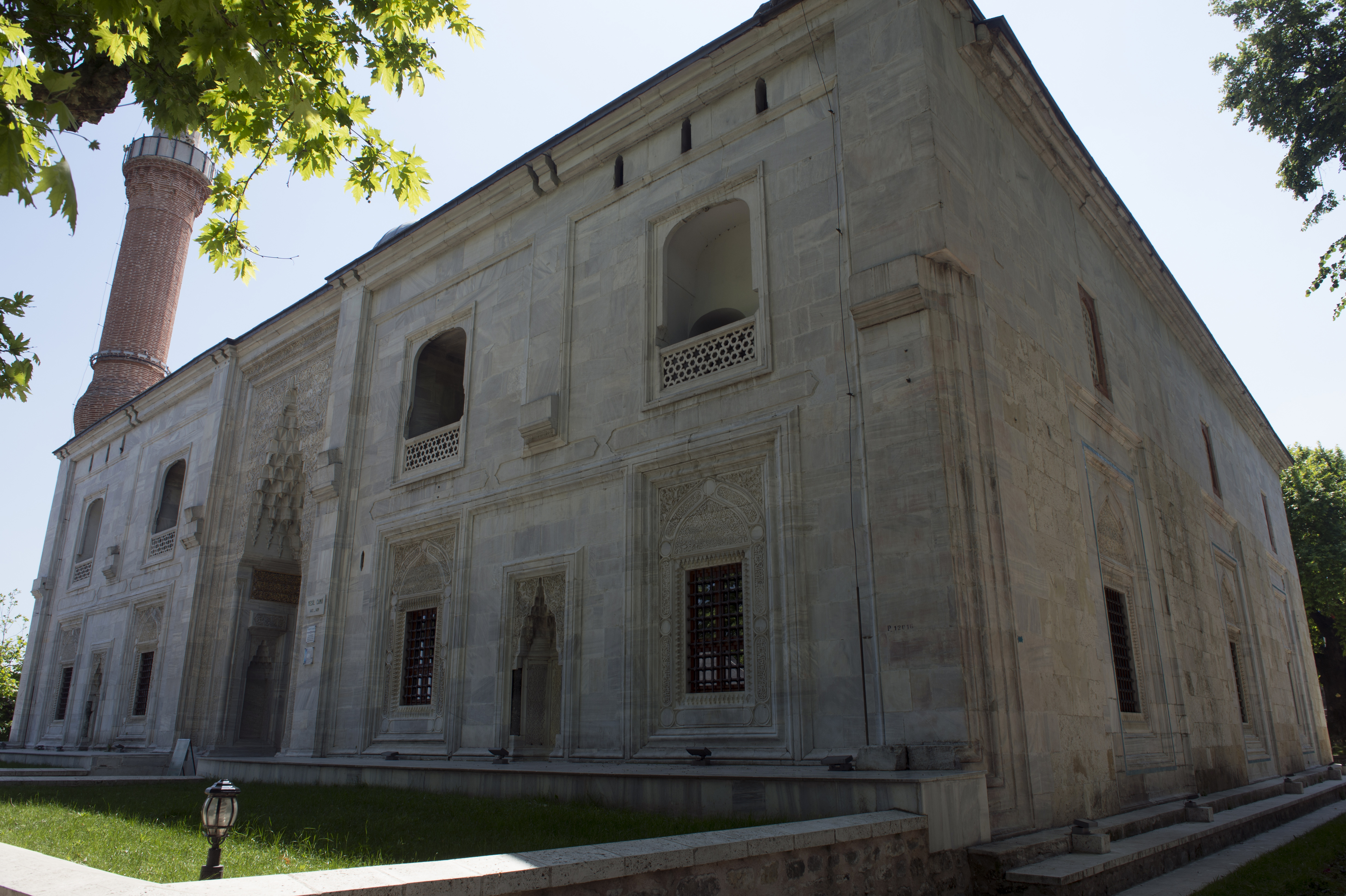
The front facade and west side of the mosque

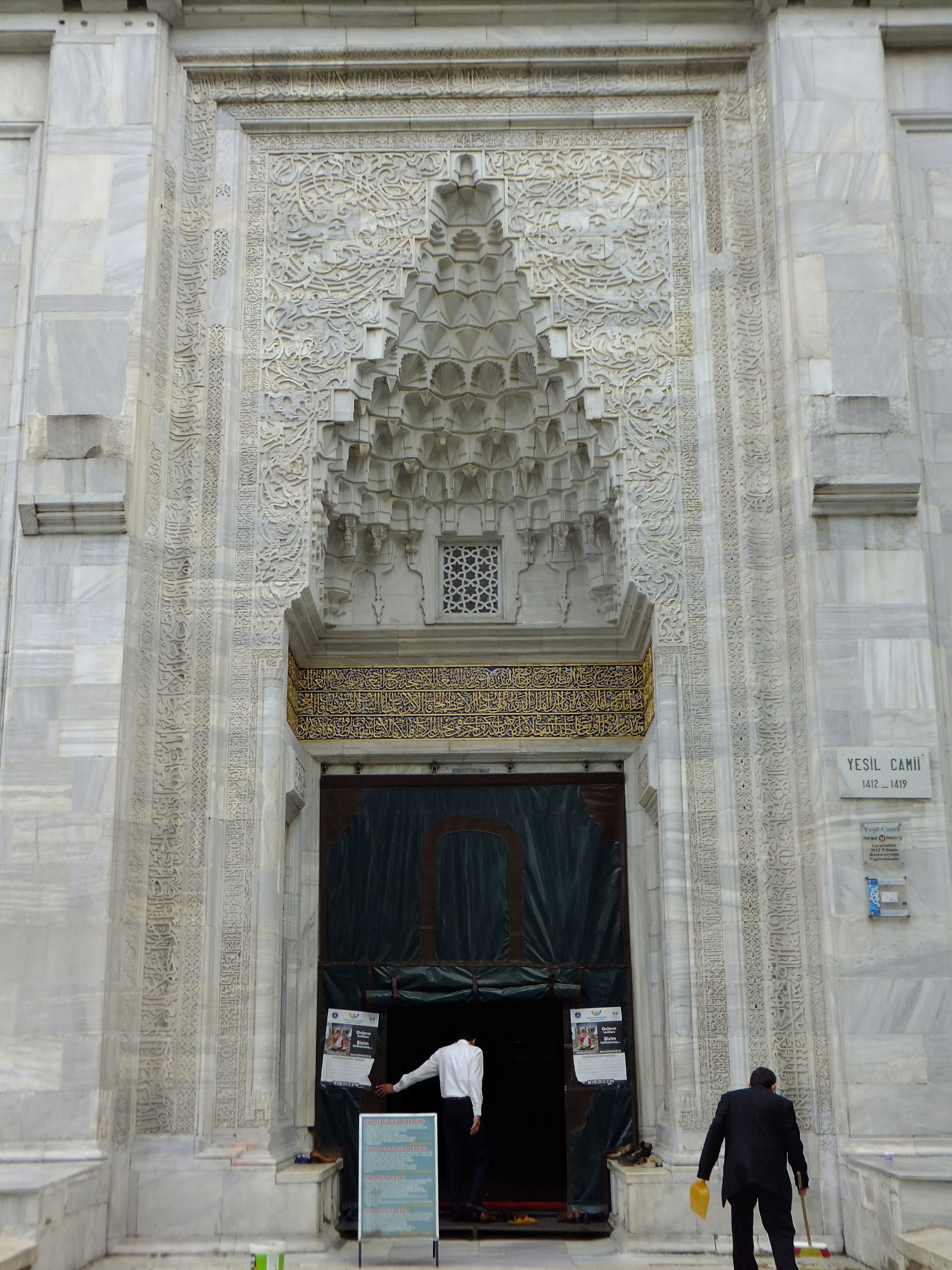
The entrance to the mosque, featuring a carved muqarnas portal

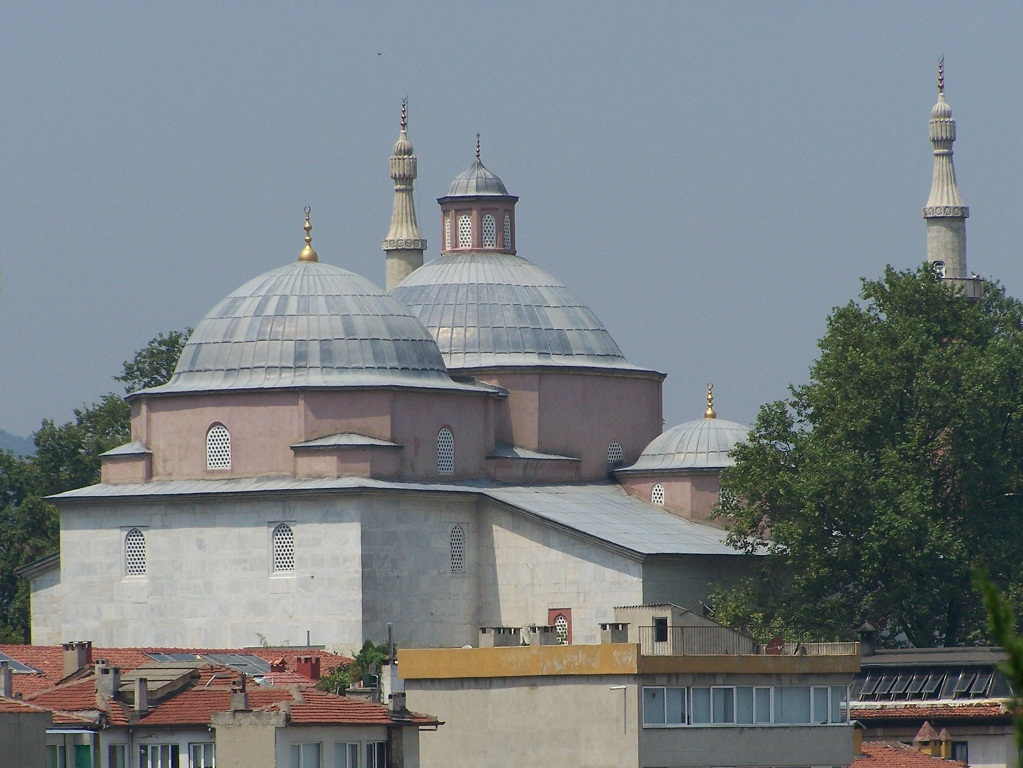
Back view of the mosque and its domes; note the cupola on the main dome

== Decoration ==
=== Tiles ===
==== Overview ====
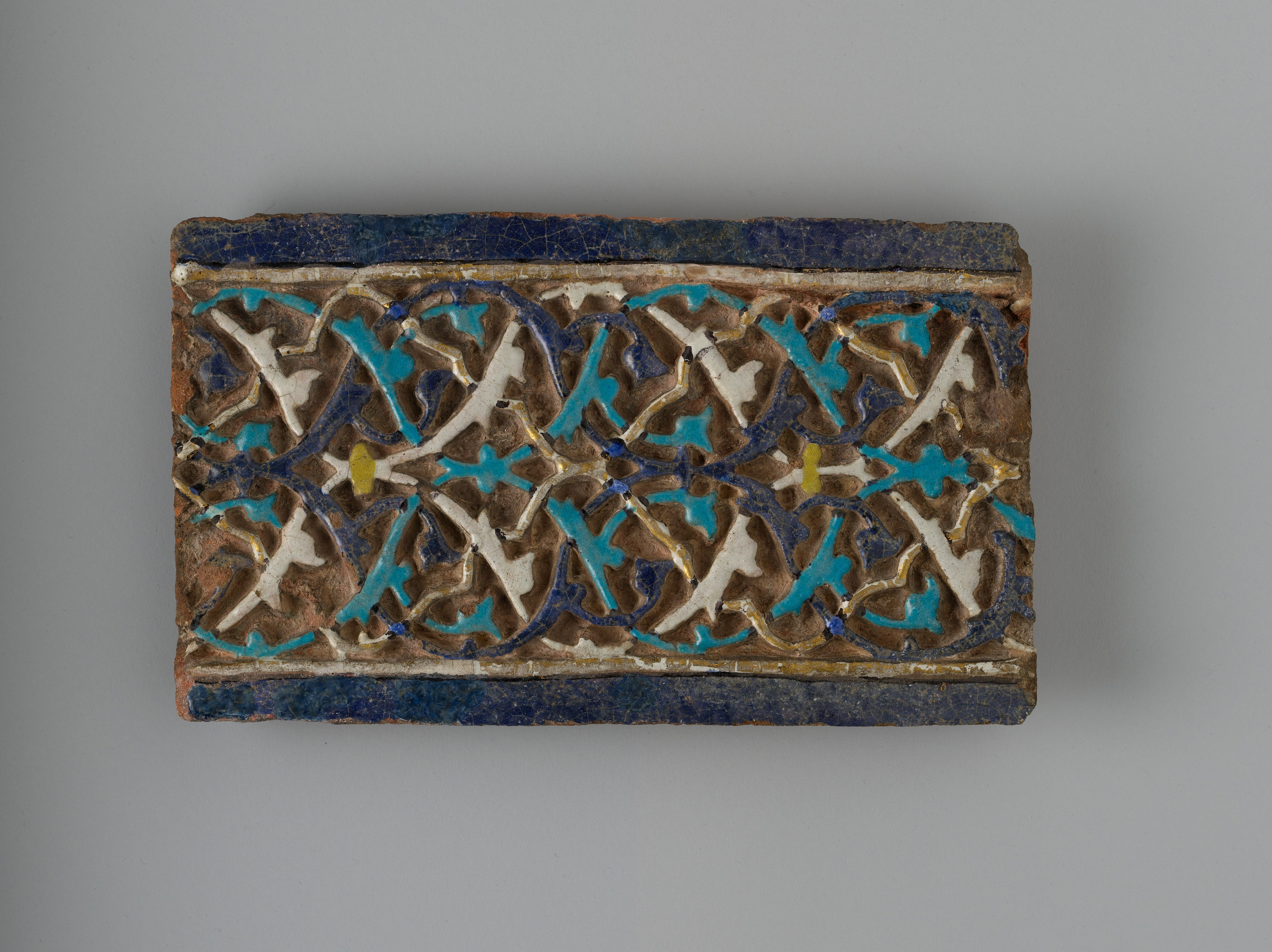
A tile from the Yeşil Türbe (Green Tomb), which was situated in the same complex as the Green Mosque. Similarly colorful and intricate tiles were used throughout the Green Mosque, particularly in the mihrab.

The Green Mosque employs a distinctively diverse range of tile techniques (including black-line tiles (often mistaken for, yet technically separate from cuerda seca tiles), monochrome underglaze tiles, mosaic, and painted terra-cotta relief) and colors (including green, blue, turquoise, white, yellow, light purple, and dark purple). The black-line tiles, which compose the majority of the tiles within the mosque, reflect an extensive Timurid influence that emerged through the empire's frequent invasions of Ottoman territories. This influence can also be observed in Timurid ceramics and architecture in Central Asia, such as the mausolea within the Shah-i Zinda shrine complex. Moreover, an inscription above the mihrab designates the black-line tiles as amal-i ustādhān-i Tabrīz ("work of the masters of Tabriz"), accompanied by a couplet from the Persian poet Sa'di. Meanwhile, the blue- and turquoise-glazed tiles in the entrance hallway and iwans, as well as the gold-adorned green hexagonal tiles in the iwans, reveal a Seljuk influence (which can also be observed in the Karatay Madrasa in Konya).

==== Interior tile decoration ====
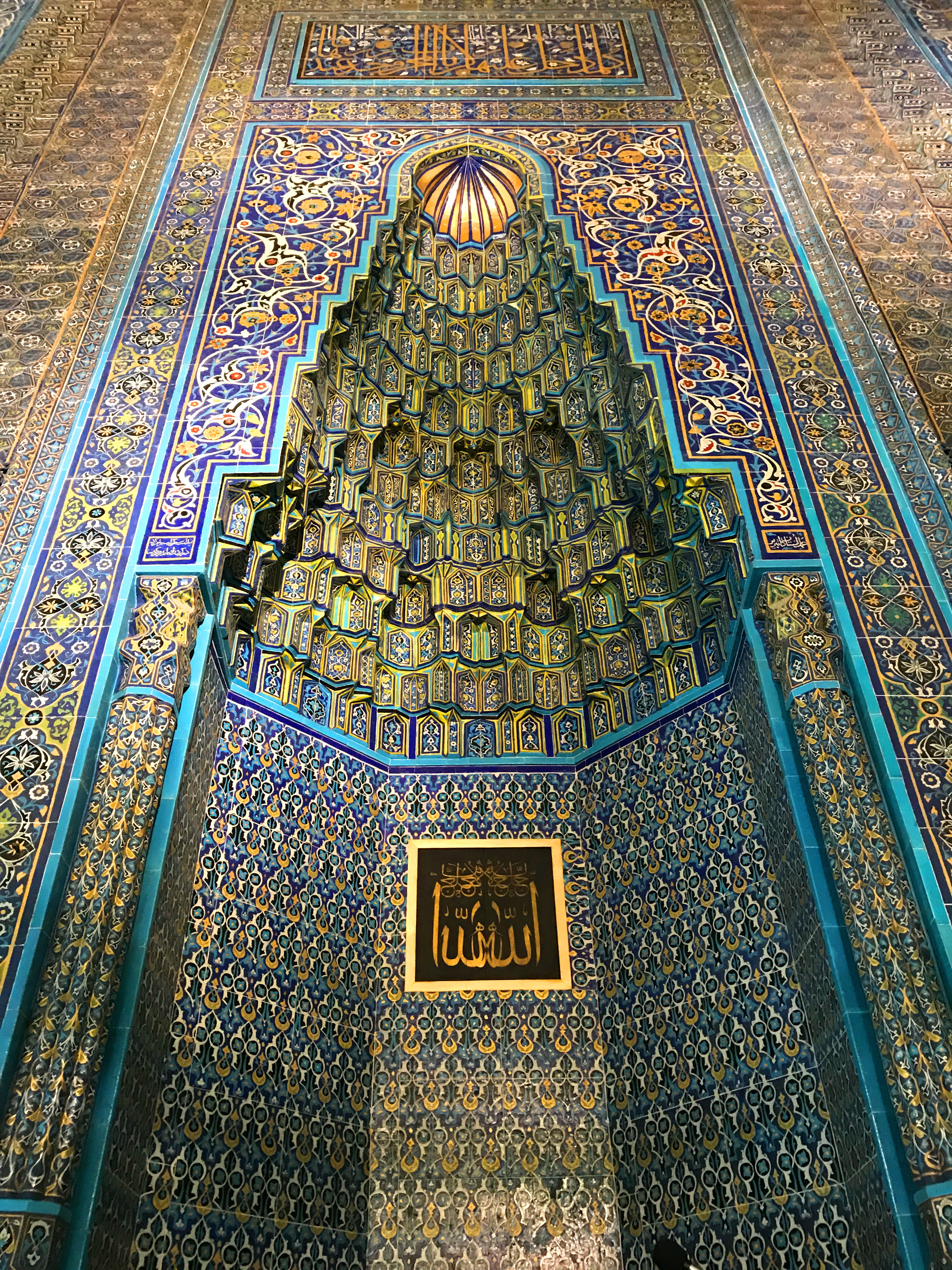
The mihrab of the mosque, featuring a wide array of intricate black-line tiles, twelve rows of muqarnas, and two ribbed columns

In the hallway connecting the vestibule to the prayer hall, dark green hexagonal tiles cover the walls, punctuated by a large roundel in the center of each wall. These roundels feature an intricate floral arabesque in black-line tiles glazed in white, yellow, green, and blue.

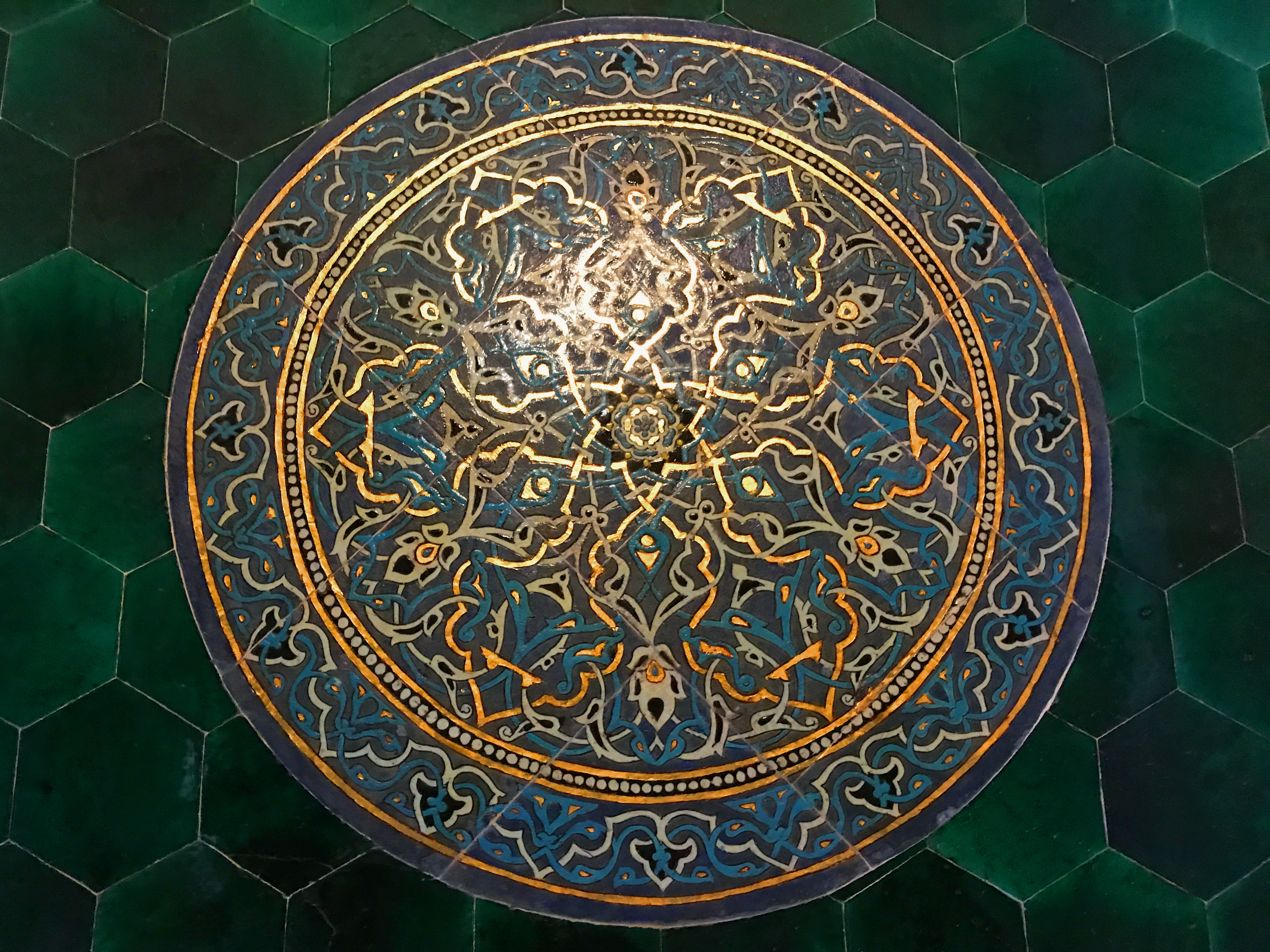
A roundel in the hallway connecting the vestibule to the prayer hall of the mosque

The recessed mahfils that flank the opening into the prayer hall are covered in similar dark green hexagonal wainscot tiles with gold decoration, with a large, intricate arabesque on each ceiling.

More of these dark green hexagonal wainscot tiles, each decorated with a thick layer of gold overlay, cover the large iwans flanking the prayer hall. A narrow floral black-line band surrounds these tiles, topped by a larger black-line band featuring a white and gold inscription upon a blue background.

In the prayer hall itself, dark green hexagonal and triangular tiles (including some nineteenth and thirteenth century replacements) cover the lower portions of the walls.

The mihrab and its moulded tile frame feature a wide array of tile styles, shapes, and colors. Square black-line tiles, glazed in blue, purple, white, and yellow, cover the mihrab's interior with geometric motifs. Equally colorful vegetal arabesques, composed of square and rectangular black-line tiles, decorate the spandrels. The mihrab niche's twelve rows of muqarnas and two ribbed columns feature similarly intricate and colorful tilework.

In the sultan's loge, the walls and ceiling are covered in gilded black-line tiles that depict motifs of stars and polygons. In contrast to these geometric motifs, the black-tile border around the opening into the mosque is decorated with vegetal motifs.

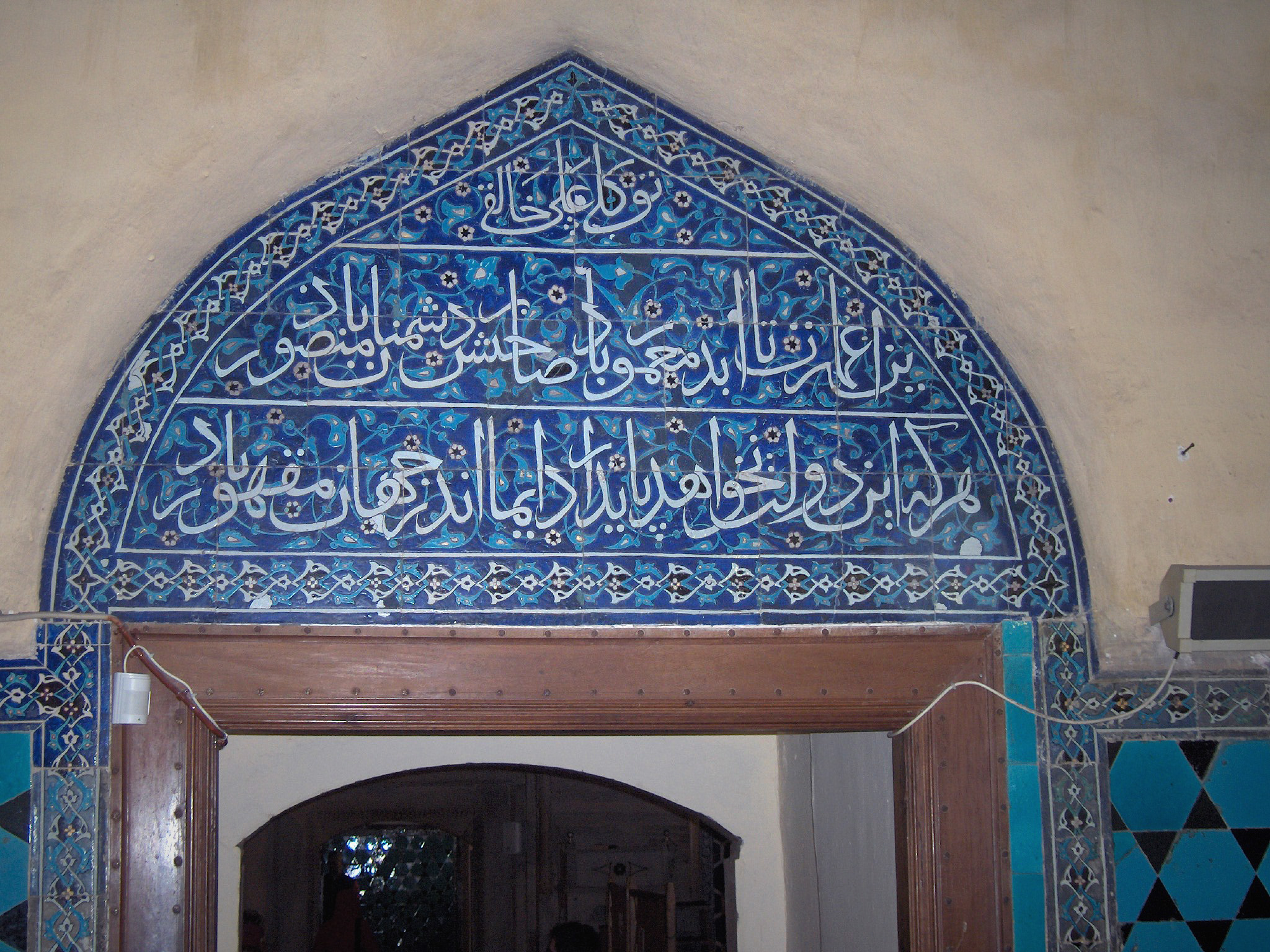
Calligraphic inscription over the door of a tabhane room

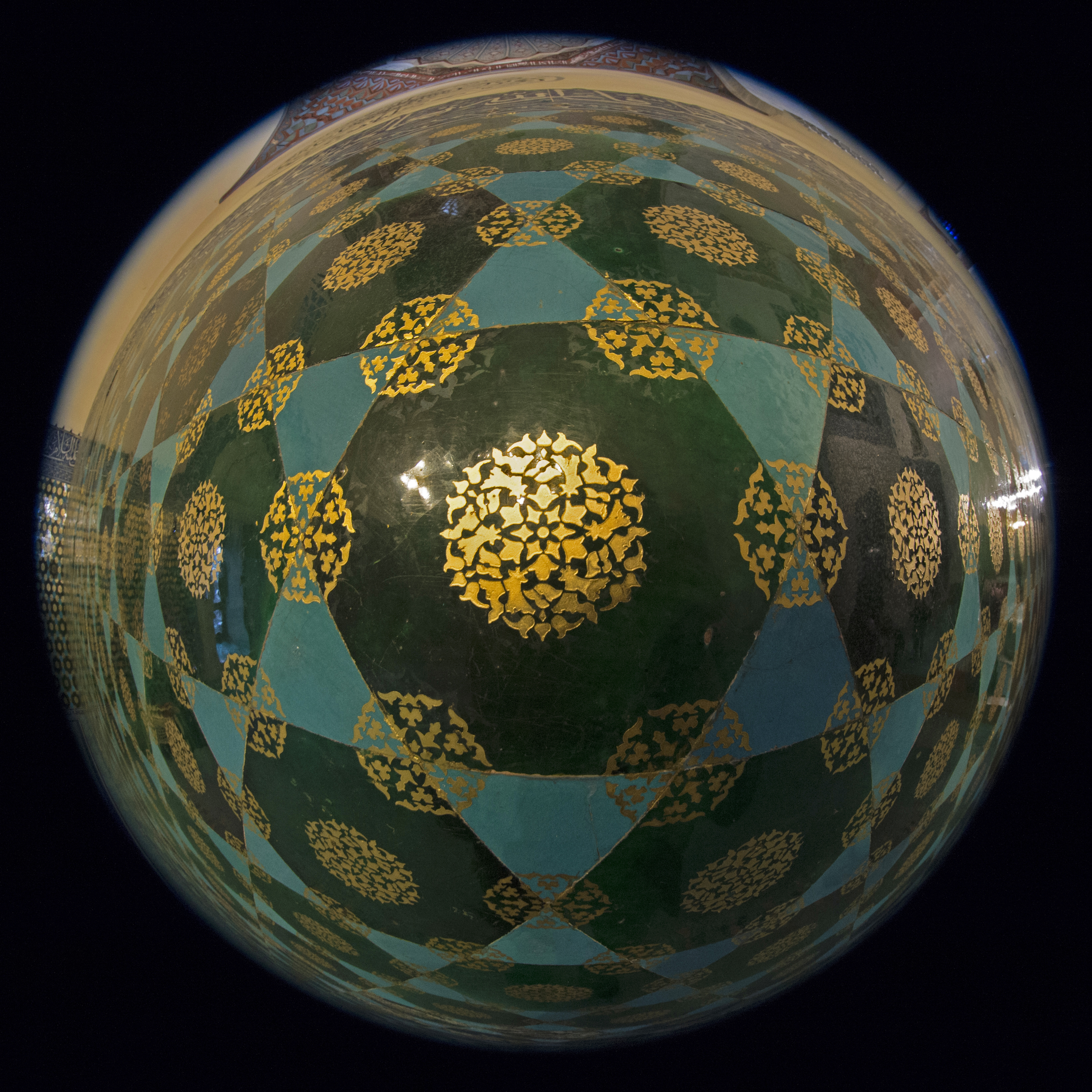
Gilded decoration of the tiles in one of the side iwans

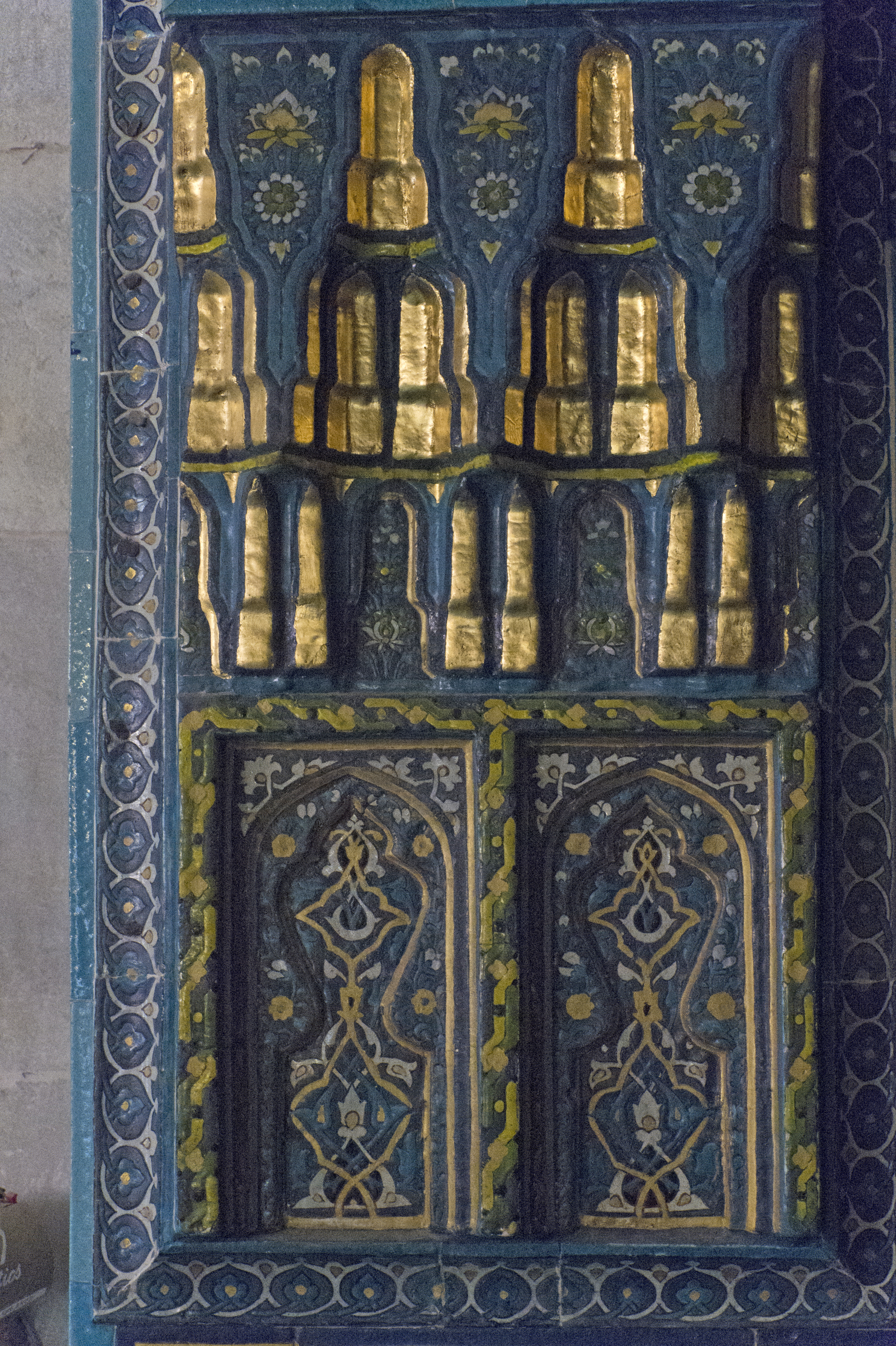
Black-line tile decoration within the mosque

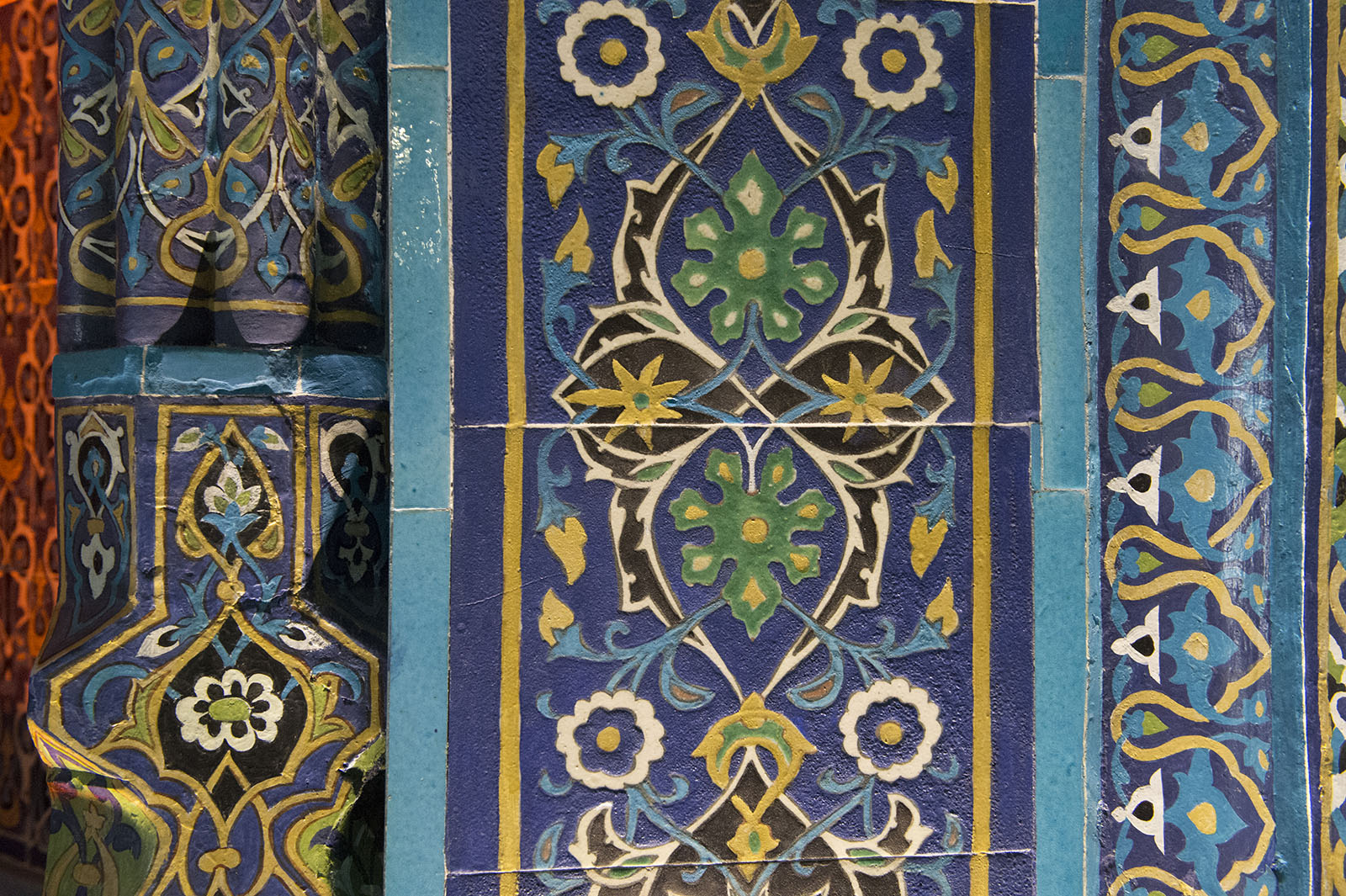
Black-line tiles decorating the mihrab

=== Carvings ===
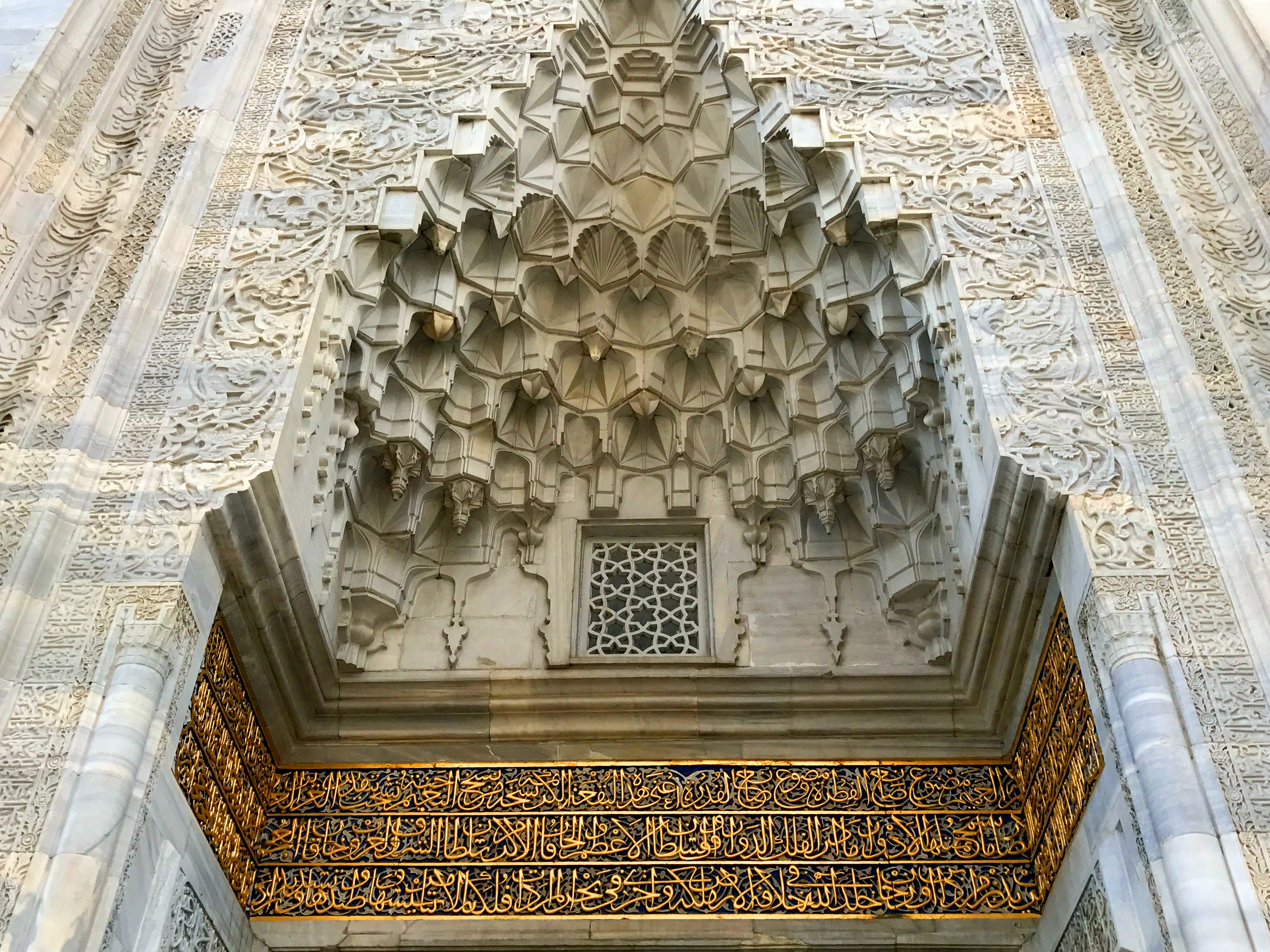
Detail of the muqarnas niche above the entrance

Carved decorations exist along all exterior elements of the mosque, from the entryway to the mihrabs to the window frames. The front portal of the mosque is made of carved marble and features a tall, recessed muqarnas niche, with unique marble tympana (decorated with arabesques) framing the flanking windows. This portal, framed with floral carvings and scripture, references similar portals found in Seljuk mosques, madrasas, and mausolea.

The two tabhane rooms connected to the central hallway, designed to provide lodging for travelers, contain carved plaster niches and ocaks (fireplaces with a tall hood). A three-line calligraphic inscription is put in an arch over one of its doors.

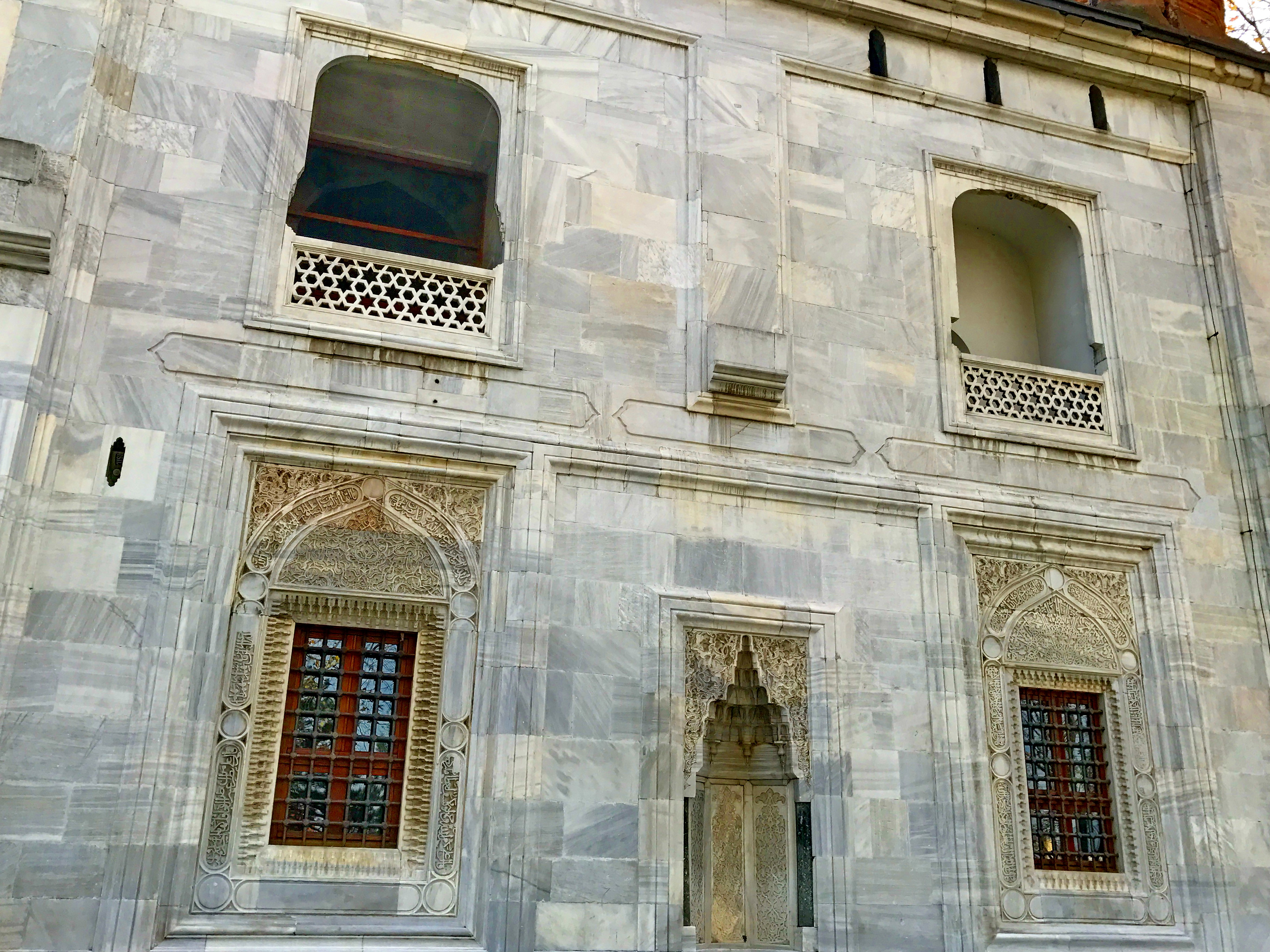
View of the mosque façade's windows and decorative niches

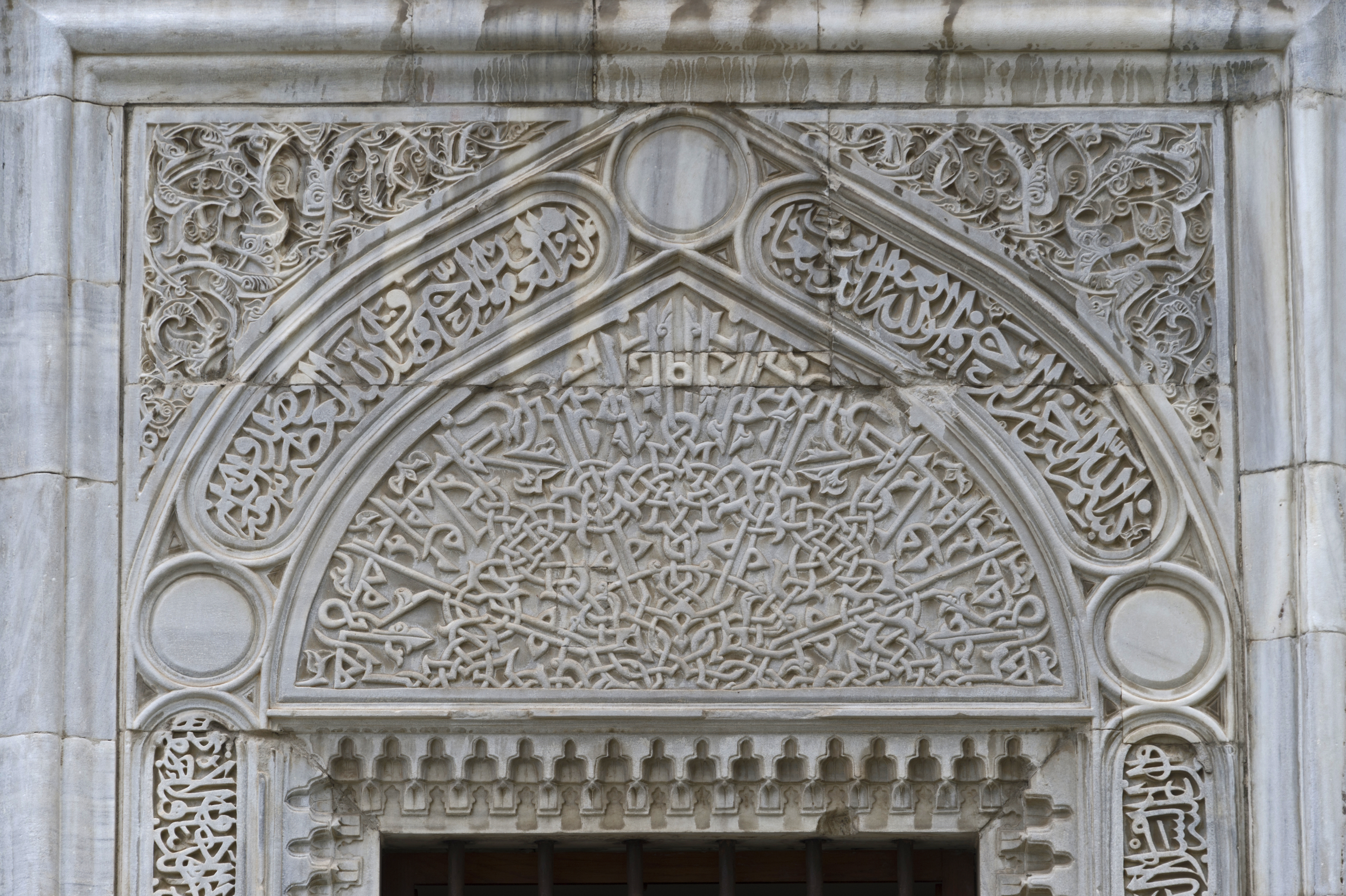
An intricately carved marble tympanum above an exterior window of the mosque

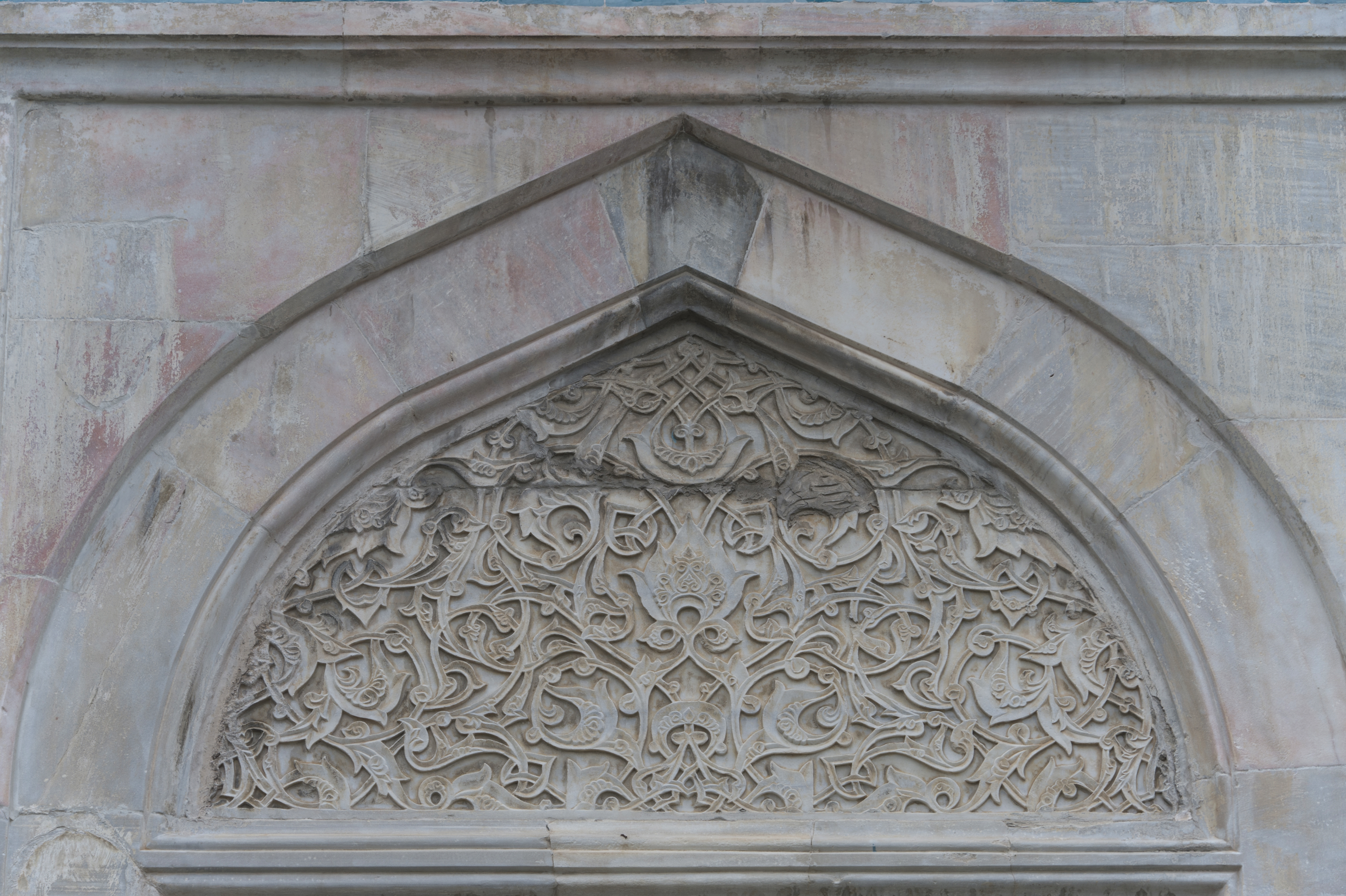
An intricately carved marble tympanum above an exterior window of the mosque

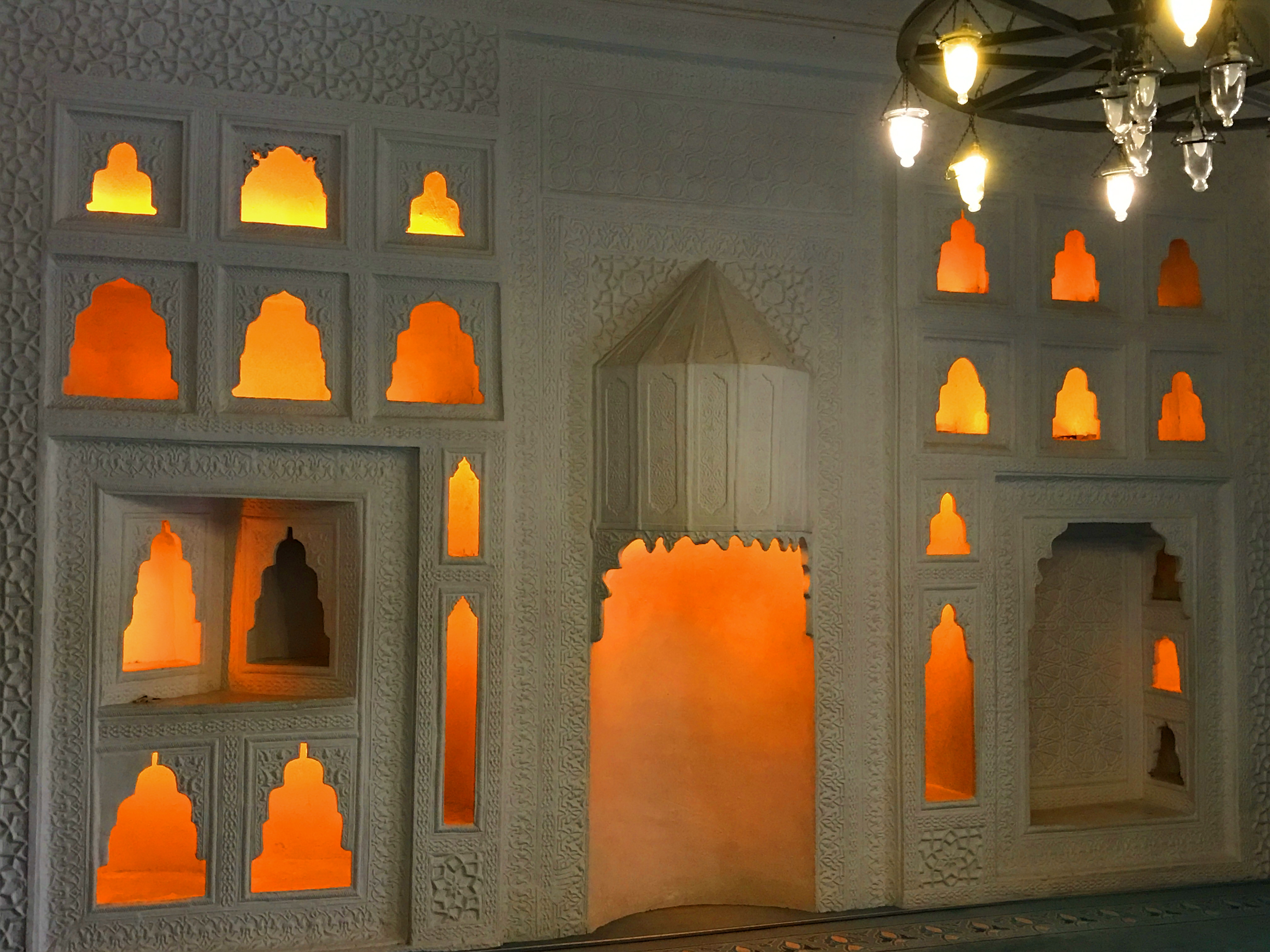
The carved niches and ocak of one of the tabhane rooms

== Other buildings of the complex ==
The mosque was the center of a larger religious and charitable complex (a külliye), which encompassed several other buildings nearby. These include the mausoleum (the Green Tomb), a madrasa, an imaret (public kitchen), and a hammam (public bathhouse).

=== Mausoleum ===
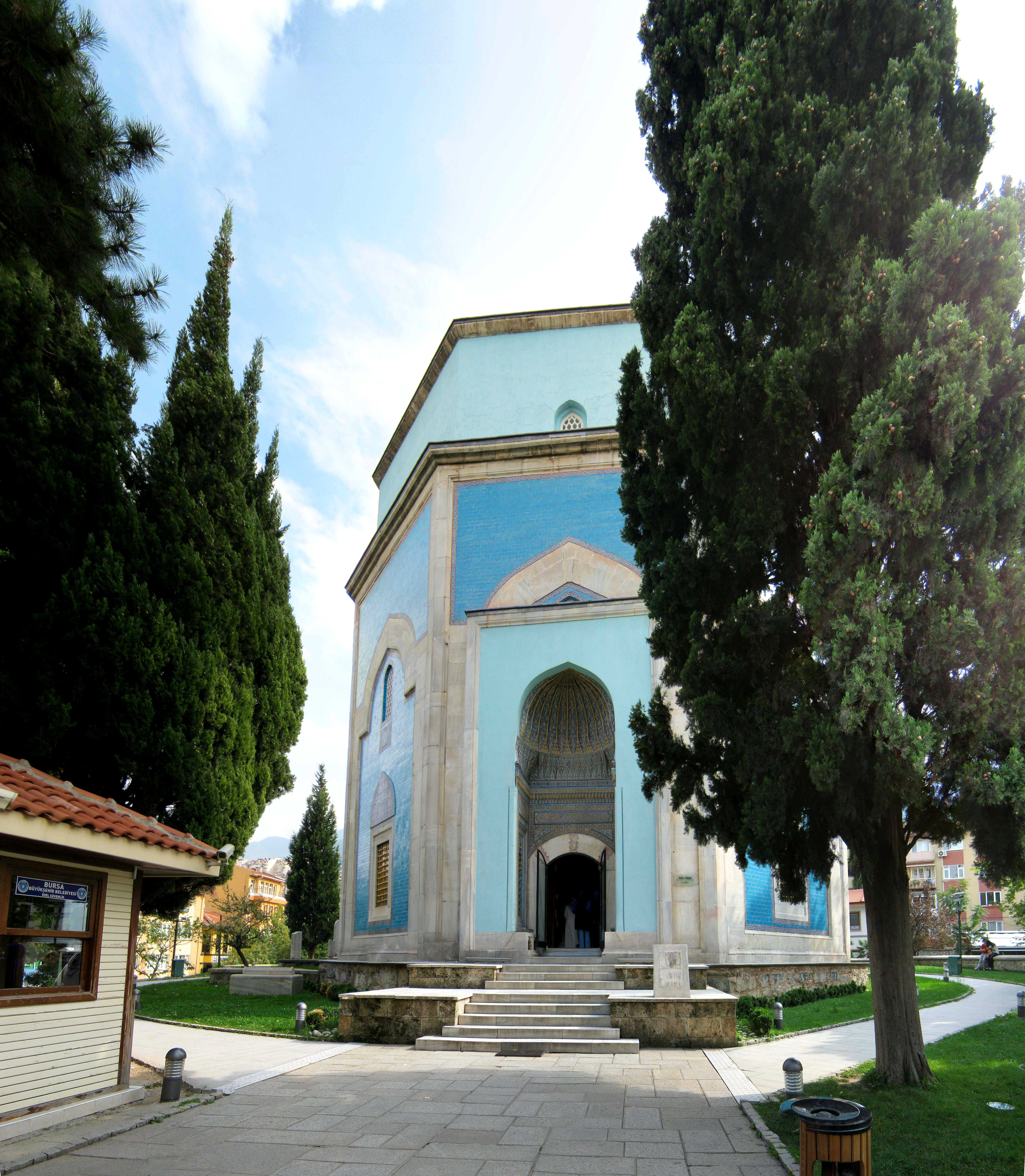
The Green Tomb

The mausoleum of Mehmed I is situated on a raised mound across from the mosque, to the southeast. It consists of an octagonal structure covered by a dome 15 metres (49 ft) in diameter. The whole building is decorated with tiles, and those of the mausoleum chamber are as rich as those in the mosque. They cover the walls, cenotaphs, and another ornate mihrab. A burial chamber or crypt (usually off limits to visitors today) is located beneath the floor of the main chamber where the cenotaphs are located. In addition to the sultan's burial, the mausoleum contains the tombs of his sons Mustafa, Mahmud, and Yusuf, as well as several women of his family and his nanny.

=== Madrasa ===
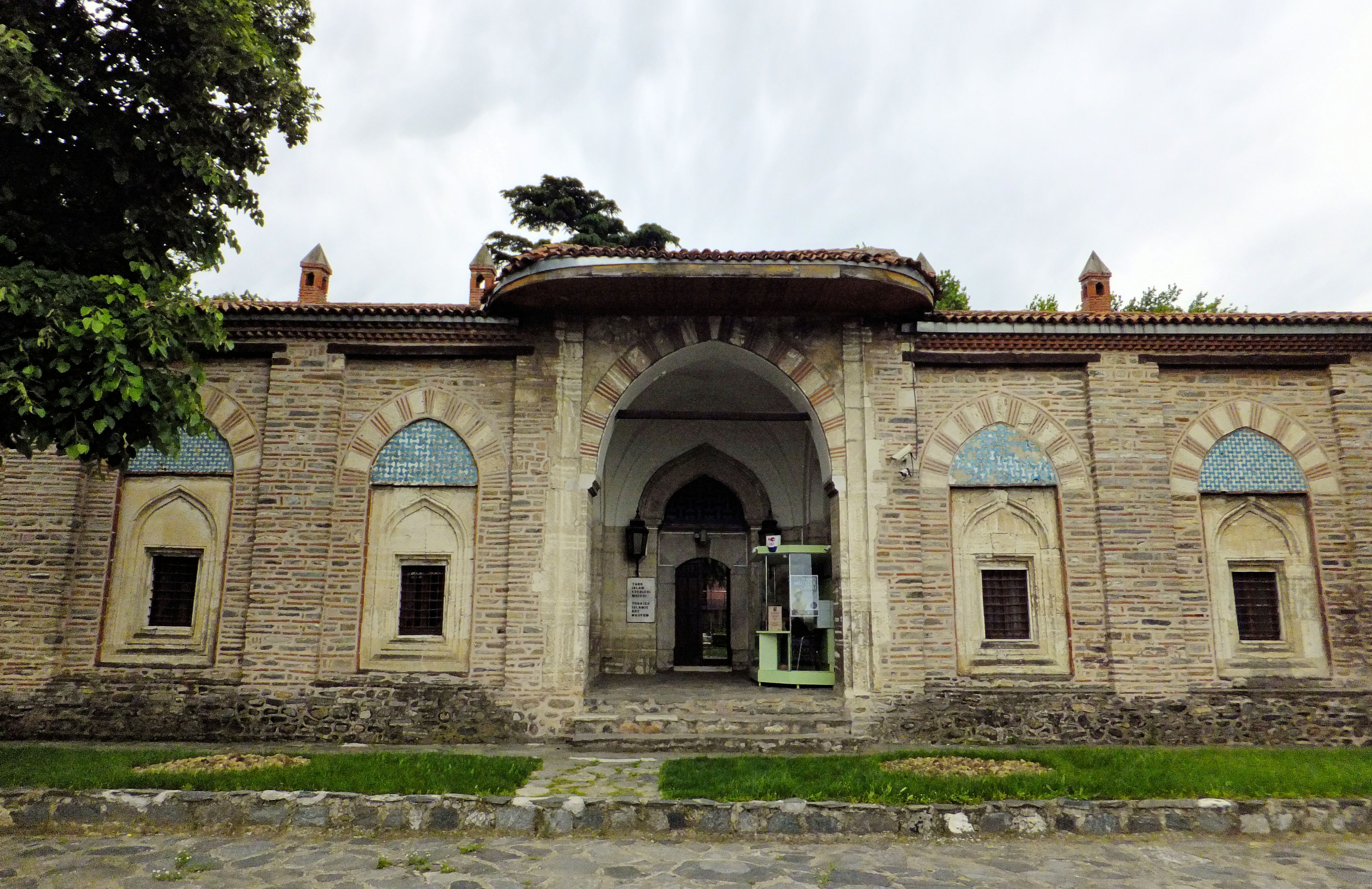
The madrasa (which now houses the Bursa Museum of Turkish and Islamic Art)

The madrasa of Mehmed I's complex, located to the southwest of the mosque, is a well-planned example of the open courtyard madrasas of this period, with similarities to the madrasas of the Seljuk era. It has a decorated entrance iwan which leads to an inner courtyard. The courtyard is flanked by arcaded porticos along three sides and a domed dershane on the side opposite the entrance. Two small iwans are also found along the two other lateral sides of the courtyard, though they stand behind the porticos. It currently houses the Bursa Museum of Turkish and Islamic Art.

=== Others ===
The hammam of the complex is located east of the Green Tomb, while the imaret is located to the northeast of the tomb. Only partials remains have been preserved from the original structures of both these buildings.
