= Bursa Museum of Turkish and Islamic Art =

Museum in Bursa, Turkey

- Bursa Türk ve İslam Eserleri Müzesi
- Established: 1904
- Location: Bursa, Turkey
- Coordinates: 40.1816°N 29.0732°E
- Type: museum

The Bursa Museum of Turkish and Islamic Art (Turkish: Bursa Türk ve İslam Eserleri Müzesi) is a museum located in the former medrese of Yeşil Complex, which was constructed within the order of the Ottoman Sultan Mehmed I in 1419. Its Turkish name is (in 2024) given as " Bursa Türk İslam Eserleri Müzesi" without the "ve", instead on some sources a "-" is given.

== History ==
The history of the museum dates back to 1904 when the first museum in Bursa was founded at Bursa Boys' Highschool to exhibit Islamic/Ottoman relics and archeological foundings which were unearthed within city's administrative boundaries. In 1929, the exhibit was moved to the present-day location of Bursa Museum of Turkish and Islamic Art. With a new building being prepared for the archeological displays in 1971, the original place within the Yeşil Complex remained a museum for Turkish and Islamic art.

== See also ==
- Turkish and Islamic Arts Museum
- Yeşil Türbe
- Bursa Treasure
- List of Art Museums
