= 1855 Bursa earthquake =

Destructive 1855 earthquake in Bursa, Turkey

- Location within Marmara
- Local date: 28 February 1855
- Magnitude: 7.02±0.64 M_{w}
- Epicenter: 40.20°N 29.10°E
- Areas affected: Turkey
- Max. intensity: MMI X (Extreme)
- Aftershocks: M_{w} 6.65±0.33, 11 April 1855
- Casualties: 1,900

The 1855 Bursa earthquake occurred on 28 February, with an estimated magnitude of 7.02±0.64 M_{w}. A devastating precursor quake took place in Mustafakemalpaşa, a town of Bursa Province, and caused severe destruction all over Bursa and other neighboring cities. Approximately 300 people died and thousands of homes and workplaces were wrecked. Some of the historical monuments and buildings, including mosques, collapsed. Subsequently, a fire spread out in the city, which increased the death toll.

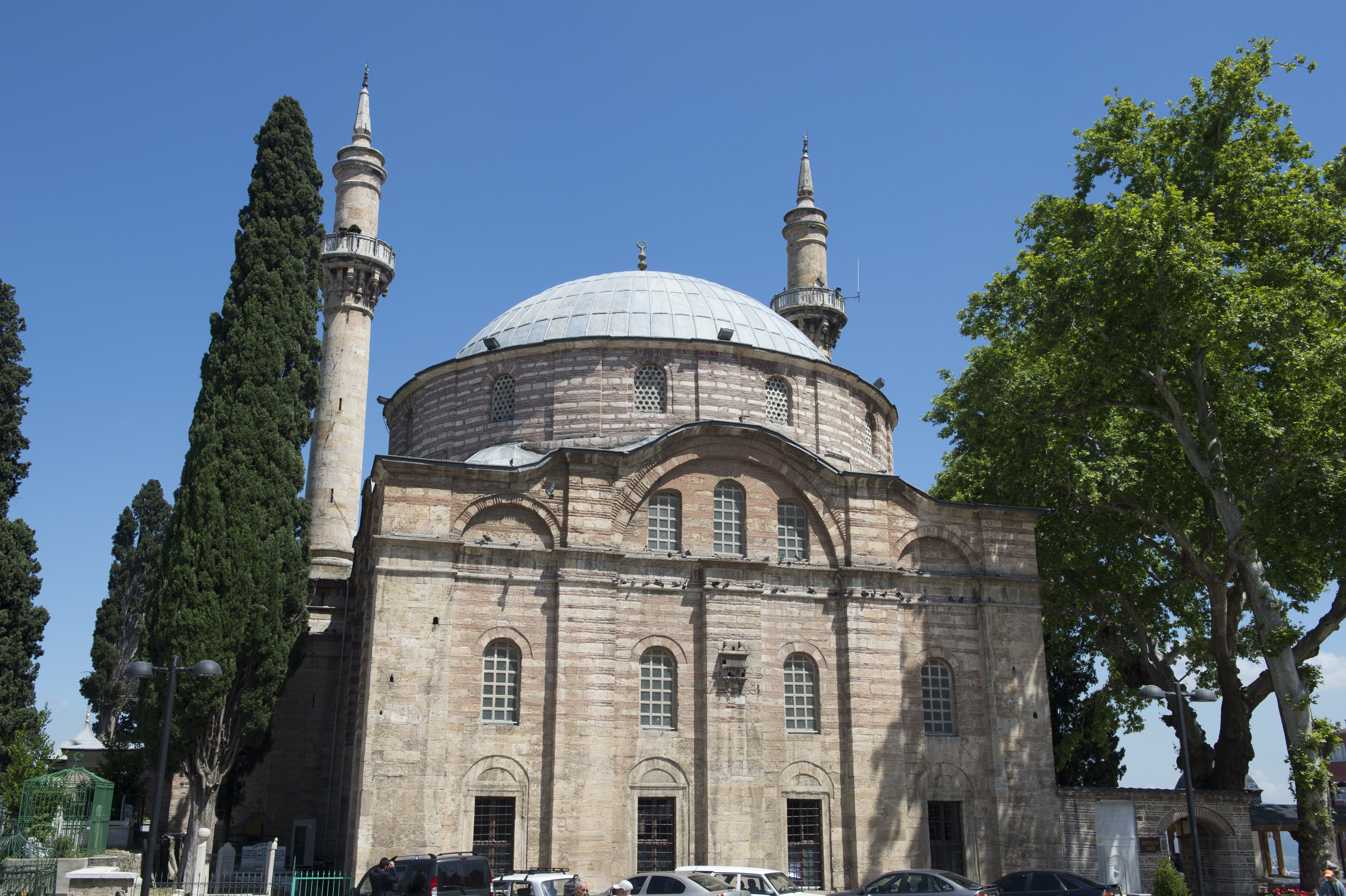
Emir Sultan Camii, rebuilt after the 1855 Bursa earthquakes

On 11 April 1855, an aftershock of the 28 February earthquake was recorded as M_{w} 6.65±0.33. This aftershock affected the region from Gemlik to Mudanya. 1,300 people died. Gökmen-zâde Seyyid el-Hâcî Hüseyin Rıfat Efendî Bursavî wrote about these earthquakes in his book İşaret-numa, written in the Ottoman Turkish language.

== See also ==
- List of earthquakes in Turkey
- List of historical earthquakes
