= Tomb of Kurt Baba =

The tomb of Kurt Baba (Turkish: Kurt Baba Türbesi) is a türbe in North Nicosia. Up until recent times, it was also known as the "Tomb of Kutup Baba" or "Üçler Tomb" (Üçler Türbesi, The Tomb of the Three), but the corruption of the name "Kutup Baba" as "Kurt Baba" stuck as the common name. It is situated in the intersection point of Asmaaltı Street and Kurt Baba Street, and in the corner of Asmaaltı Square.

The building contains three graves, believed to belong to Kutup Baba, a bektashi sheikh that fell during the Ottoman conquest of Nicosia, and two of his followers. It is not known which of the graves belongs to Kutup Baba. The three graves lie in an east-west axis and are covered by wooden boxes, having lost their original structure. The building has an entrance to the north and three arched windows with iron bars. These bars have traditionally had green cloths tied to them and candles lit in front of them. During the Ottoman period, the maintenance of the tomb was achieved by the employment of a türbedar. Hacı Hasan Baba is recorded as the türbedar for the last years of the Ottoman rule and the first years of the British colonial rule. He was employed on a charter issued by the Ottoman Sultanate to keep the tomb open for visits. The payment of his wage was the shared responsibility of the Islamic sharia courts and the Evkaf Administration, with the Evkaf providing the greater part of the salary. The position of türbedar was hereditary and would pass from father to son. As such, after his death in 1885, his son Abdülaziz bin Hacı Hasan assumed the duty, but had his salary terminated by the accountant of the Evkaf under the British administration.

During the early British rule, the building was taken care of due to donations by notables in the Evkaf Administration: Mehmed Sadık Efendi, Musa İrfan Bey and Mehmet Münir. After that, the building was left dilapidated for several decades. It was restored by the Evkaf Administration in 1988.
