= Gazi Husrev-beg Mosque =

Mosque in Sarajevo, Bosnia and Herzegovina

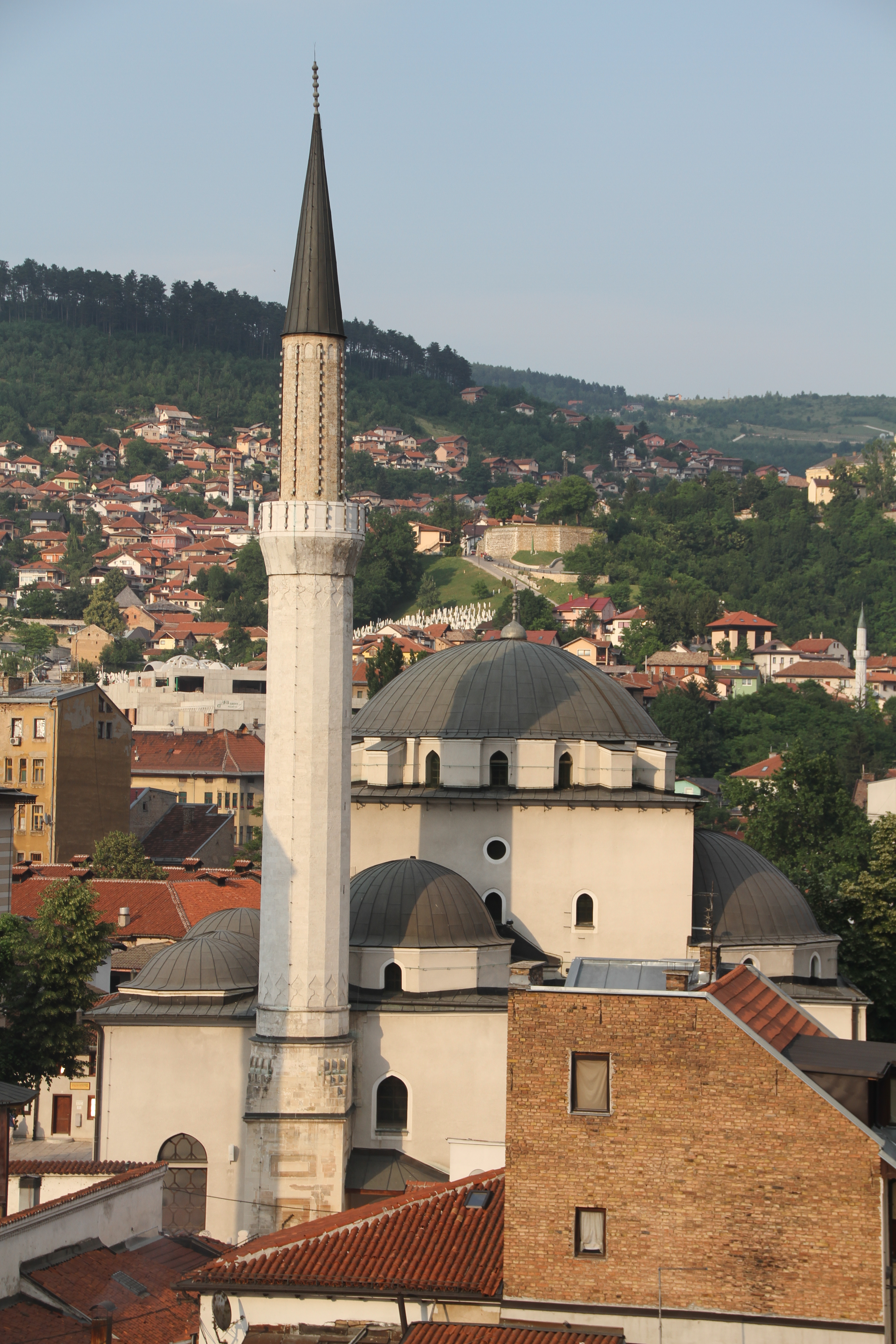
- The mosque, viewed from Hotel Europe

- Location of the mosque in Sarajevo

Religion
- Affiliation: Sunni Islam
- Ecclesiastical or organizational status: Mosque
- Status: Active

Location
- Location: Baščaršija, Sarajevo
- Country: Bosnia and Herzegovina
- Interactive map of Gazi Husrev-beg Mosque
- Coordinates: 43°51′33″N 18°25′44.5″E

Architecture
- Architect: Acem Ali Tabrizi "Alaüddin"
- Type: Mosque
- Style: Ottoman
- Founder: Gazi Husrev-beg
- Completed: 1531

Specifications
- Capacity: c. 1,500 worshipers (incl. c. 500 in the sahn)
- Dome: 9
- Dome height (outer): 26 m (85 ft)
- Dome dia. (outer): 13 m (43 ft)
- Minaret: 1
- Minaret height: 47 m (154 ft)

The Gazi Husrev-beg Mosque (Bosnian: Gazi Husrev-begova džamija; Turkish: Gazi Hüsrev Bey Camii) is a Sunni mosque in the city of Sarajevo, Bosnia and Herzegovina. Built in the 16th century, it is the largest historical mosque in Bosnia and Herzegovina and one of the most representative Ottoman structures in the Balkans.

Having been Sarajevo's central mosque since the days of its construction, it also serves as the main congregational mosque of the Muslims in Bosnia and Herzegovina. It is located in the Baščaršija neighborhood in the Stari Grad municipality and, being one of the main architectural monuments in the town, is regularly visited by tourists.

The mosque was named in honour of Gazi Husrev-beg, who founded the mosque and is interned in the adjacent mausoleum.

== History ==
The Gazi Husrev-beg Mosque was built in 1530 as the central object of the Beg's endowment, which also included a maktab and a madrasa, a bezistan (vaulted marketplace), and a hammam, etc. The foundation of this waqf by the contemporary Ottoman governor of Bosnia had a crucial point in the development of the town. The architect's name is unknown, but after some speculations, which even included famous Mimar Sinan as an option, most scholars agreed that Acem Ali Tabrizi "Alaüddin", an Ottoman mimar of Persian ancestry, is the most probable builder. It is still possible that Sinan himself did inspect the work on the spot, since he was in the region at the time. Historical documents testify that Ragusan masons, requested from their government by Gazi Husrev-beg, participated in the building process.

The Gazi Husrev-bey Mosque was the first mosque in the world to receive electricity and electric illumination in 1898 during the period of Austro-Hungarian Empire.

== Architecture ==
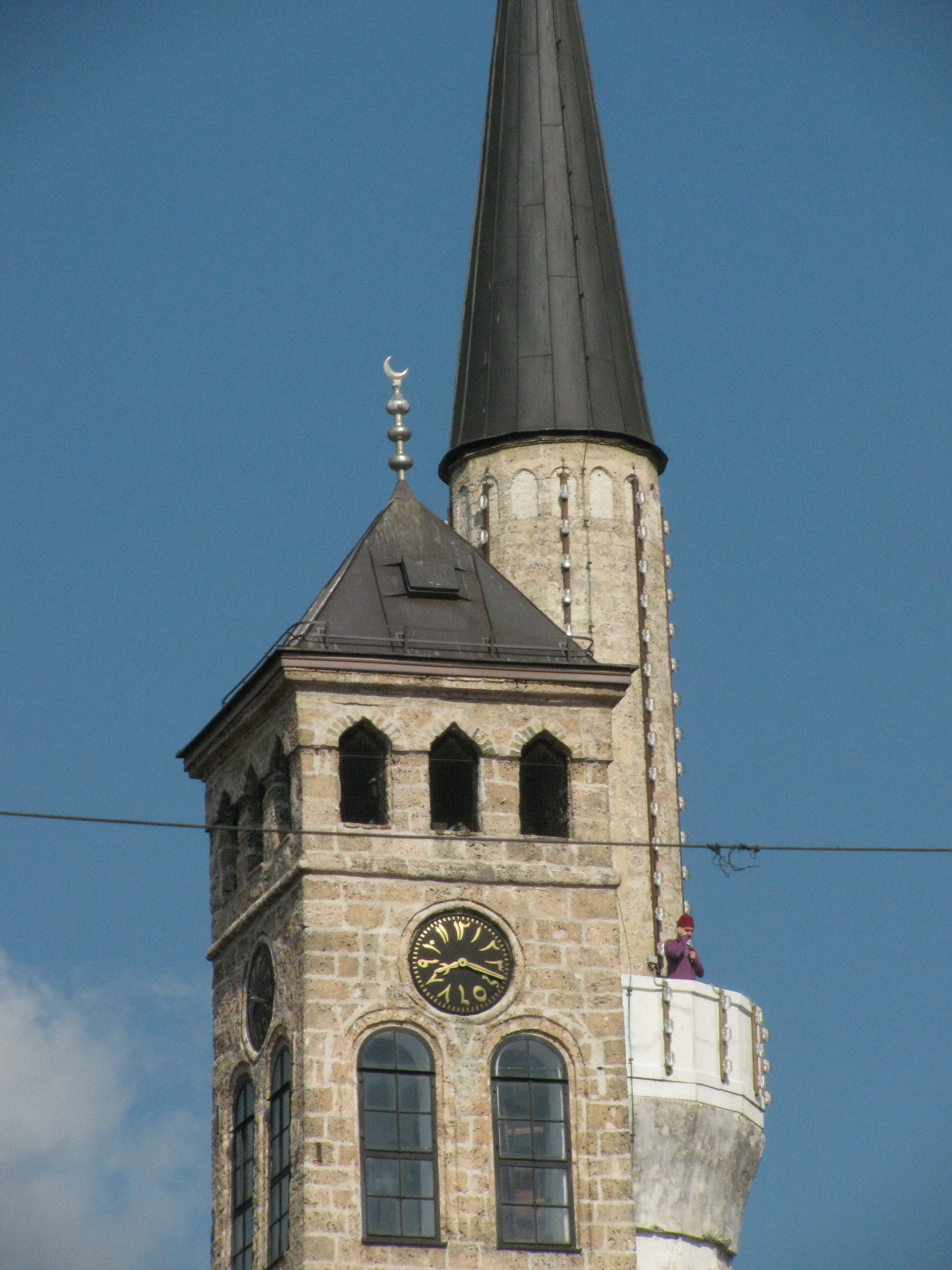
The minaret with the Muezzin calling to prayer; in front is the Ottoman-era Sarajevo Clock Tower.

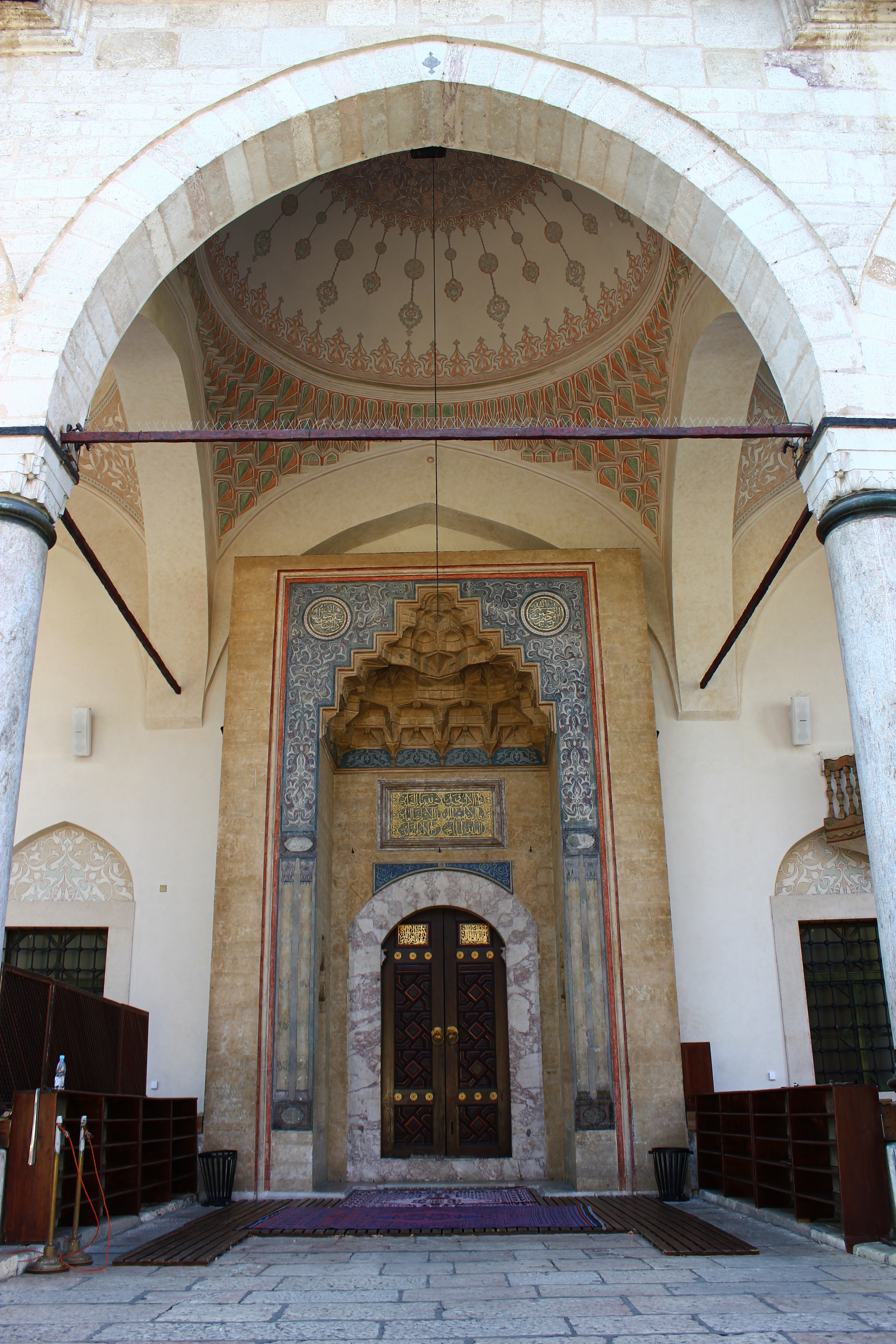
The main entrance portal with an islamic arch before entering, and intricately carved muqarnas on the portal and on the dome pendentives above. There is also an ablaq design around the main entrance as well.

The mosque belongs to the type of complex-spaced, multi-domed mosques and it is a represent of the Early Period of Classical Ottoman architecture (sometimes referred to as the Early Istanbul style). The central rectangular space, framed by high walls and covered with a dome resting on pendentives, represents the spine of the structure, while lower extensions lean to it and expand the volume of the interior space. The qibla side of the mosque is extended with a rectangular space which is covered by a semi-dome resting on two highly developed muqarnas structures. They stand in function of pendentives, reducing the rectangular outline of the ground level to the near semi-circle shape in level of the semi-dome. This area houses central architectural elements with religious purposes: mihrab, minbar and kursi and, being open to the central space with a huge arch, represents the focal point of the mosque. Two smaller spaces, called tetime (sg. tetima) are located on the left and right sides of the central space, placed furthest from the Kibla side. They are covered by two lower domes resting on pendentives.

The exterior is dominated by the main dome, topped out only by a simple, yet monumental minaret. The entry side is marked with a portico resting on four wide columns and covered with little domes, only the central one, above the portal, being a bit greater than others, and resting on muqarnas-adorned pendentives, in contrast to others which are laid on simple, plain-surfaced pendentives. The monumental portal is richly decorated with muqarnas, as well as columns' capitals.

In his legacy, he stated: "Good deeds drive away evil, and one of the most worthy of good deeds is the act of charity, and the most worthy act of charity is one which lasts forever. Of all charitable deeds, the most beautiful is one that continually renews itself."

=== Destruction and reconstruction ===
During the Siege of Sarajevo, Serbian forces purposely targeted many cultural centres of the city, such as museums, libraries, and mosques, and fired on them. As the largest and best known, the Beg's mosque was an obvious target. Having suffered a significant amount of destruction, the reconstruction of the mosque started with foreign - mainly Saudi - aid in 1996, right after the war. The old and faded layer of Austro-Hungarian decoration was removed and, since remains of older, historical layers of decorative painting weren't found, a completely new interior was designed and applied by Bosnian calligrapher Hazim Numanagić in 2001/2002. Austro-Hungarian decoration, performed mostly in pseudo-Moorish style, remains only on the portal of the mosque today.

== Gallery ==
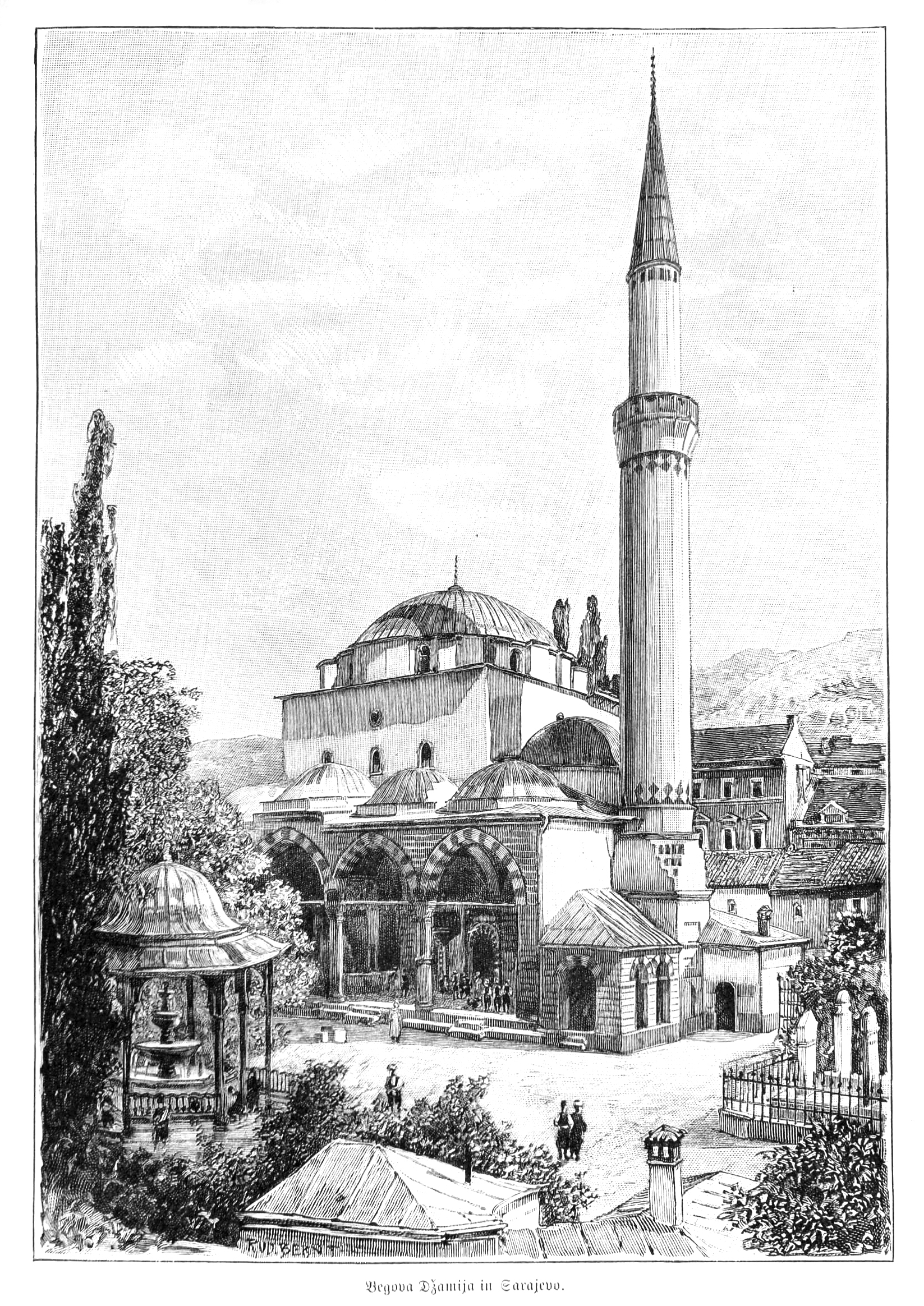
The mosque in 1900

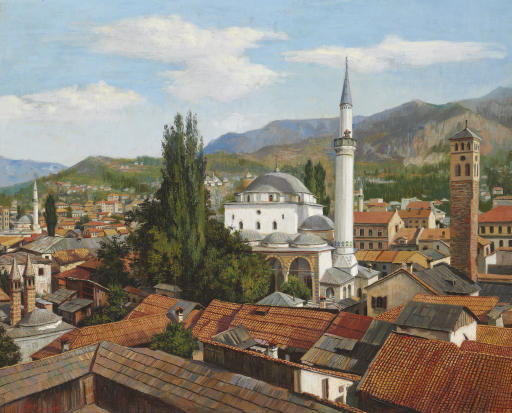
The mosque in the 19th century

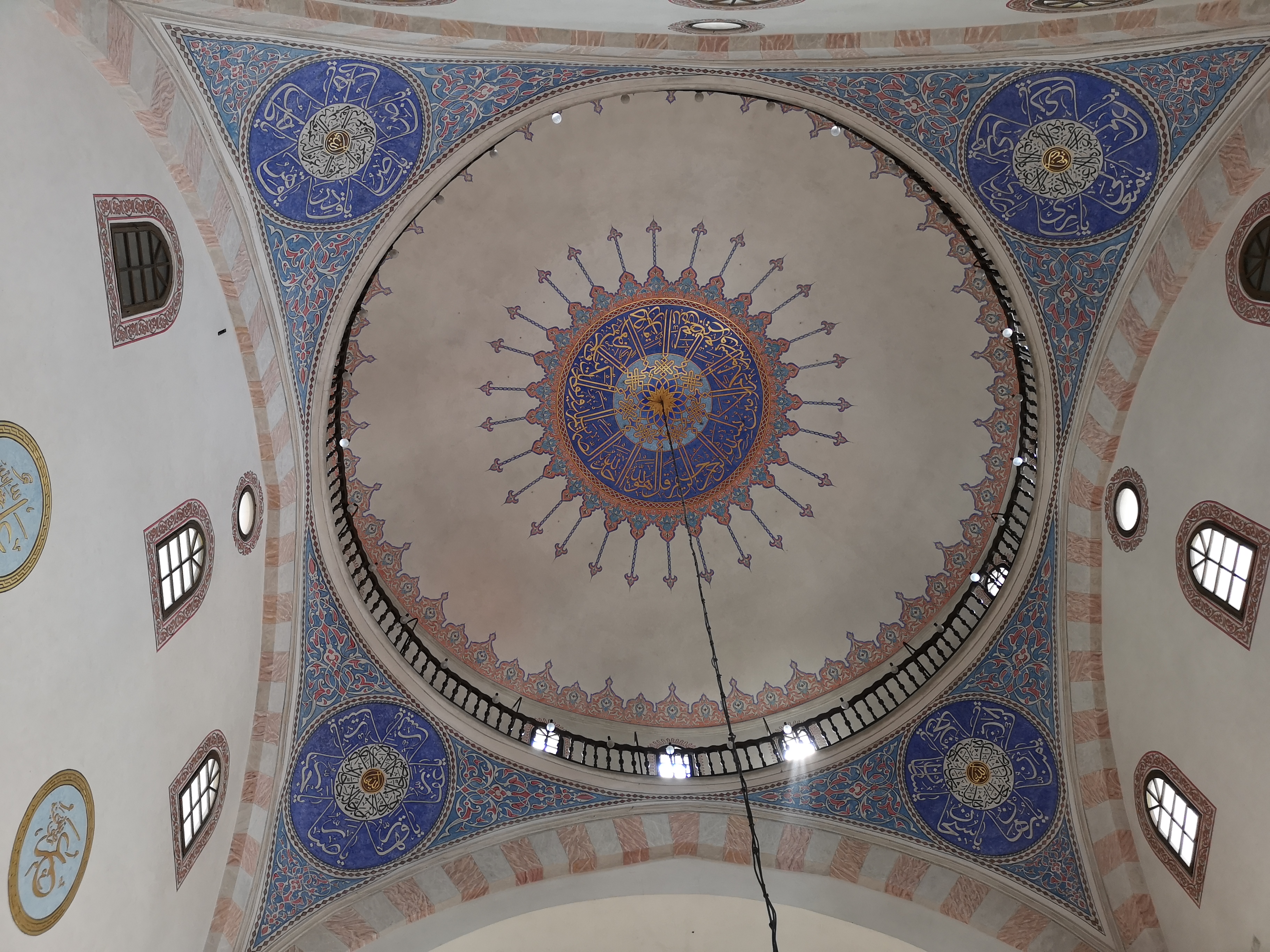
The interior of the dome

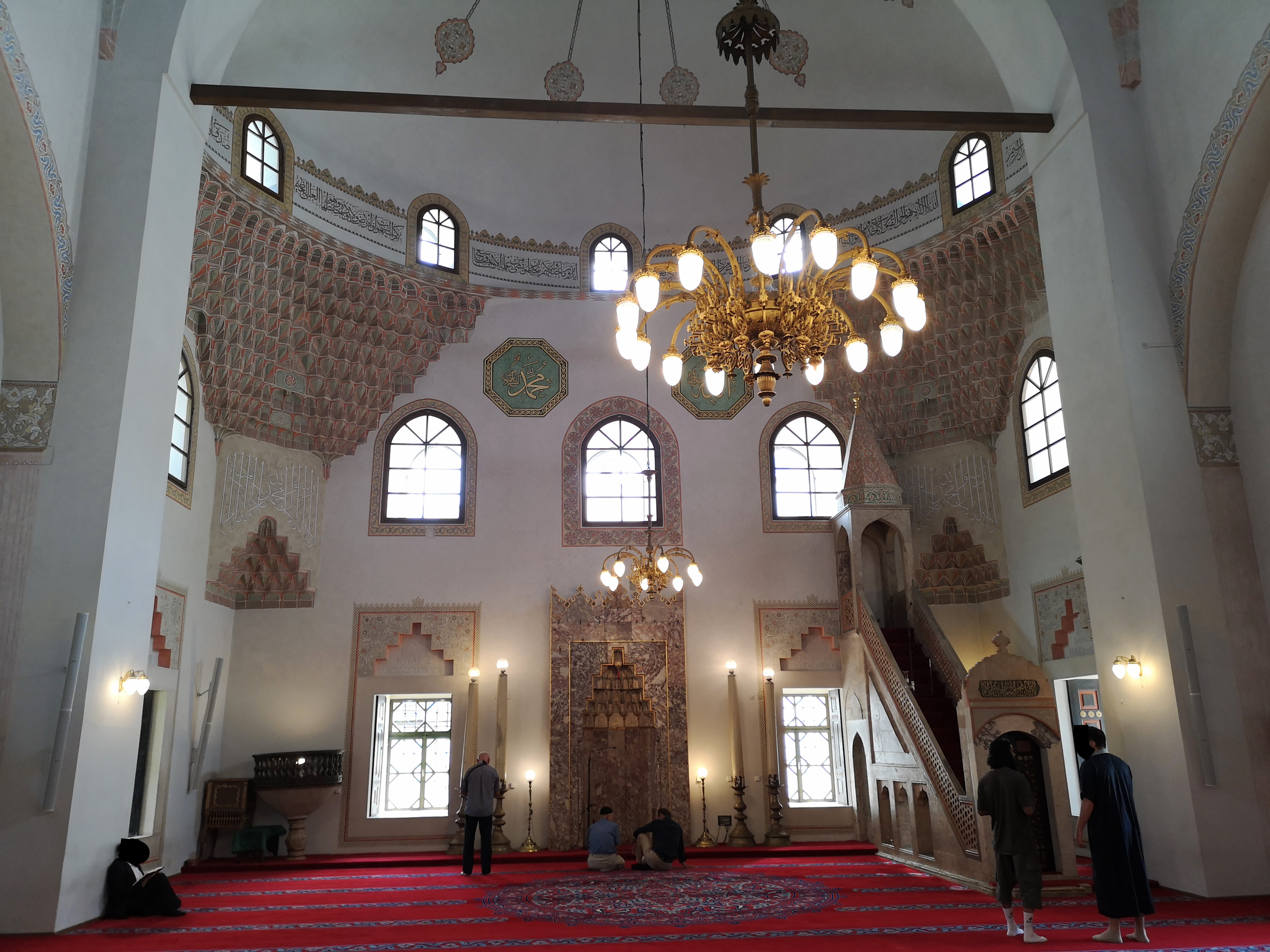
Interior of the mosque

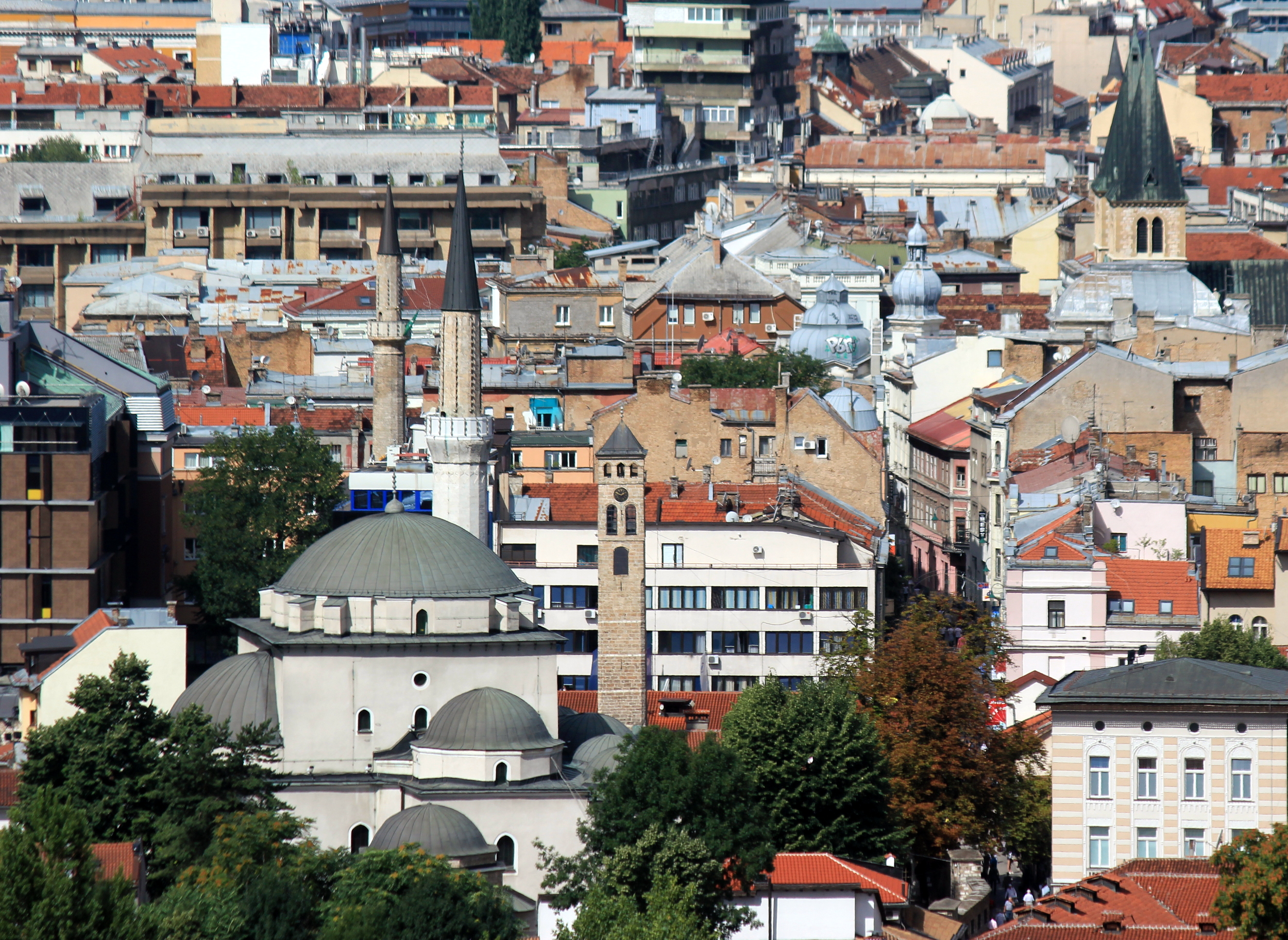
East side of the mosque

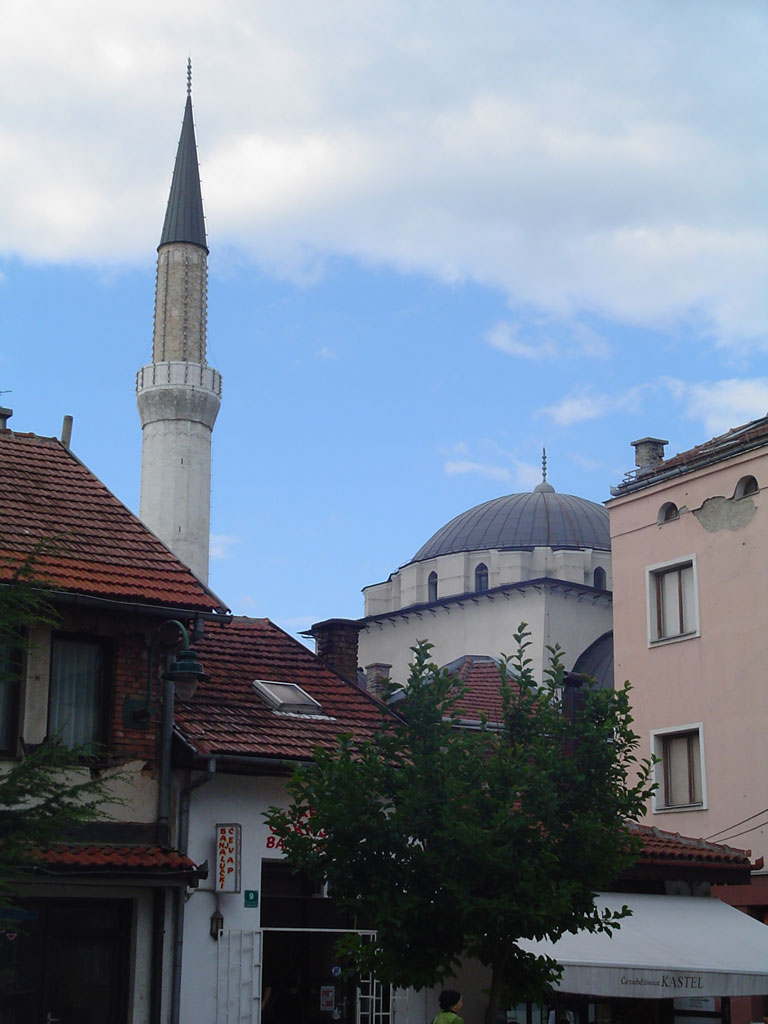
View from the market

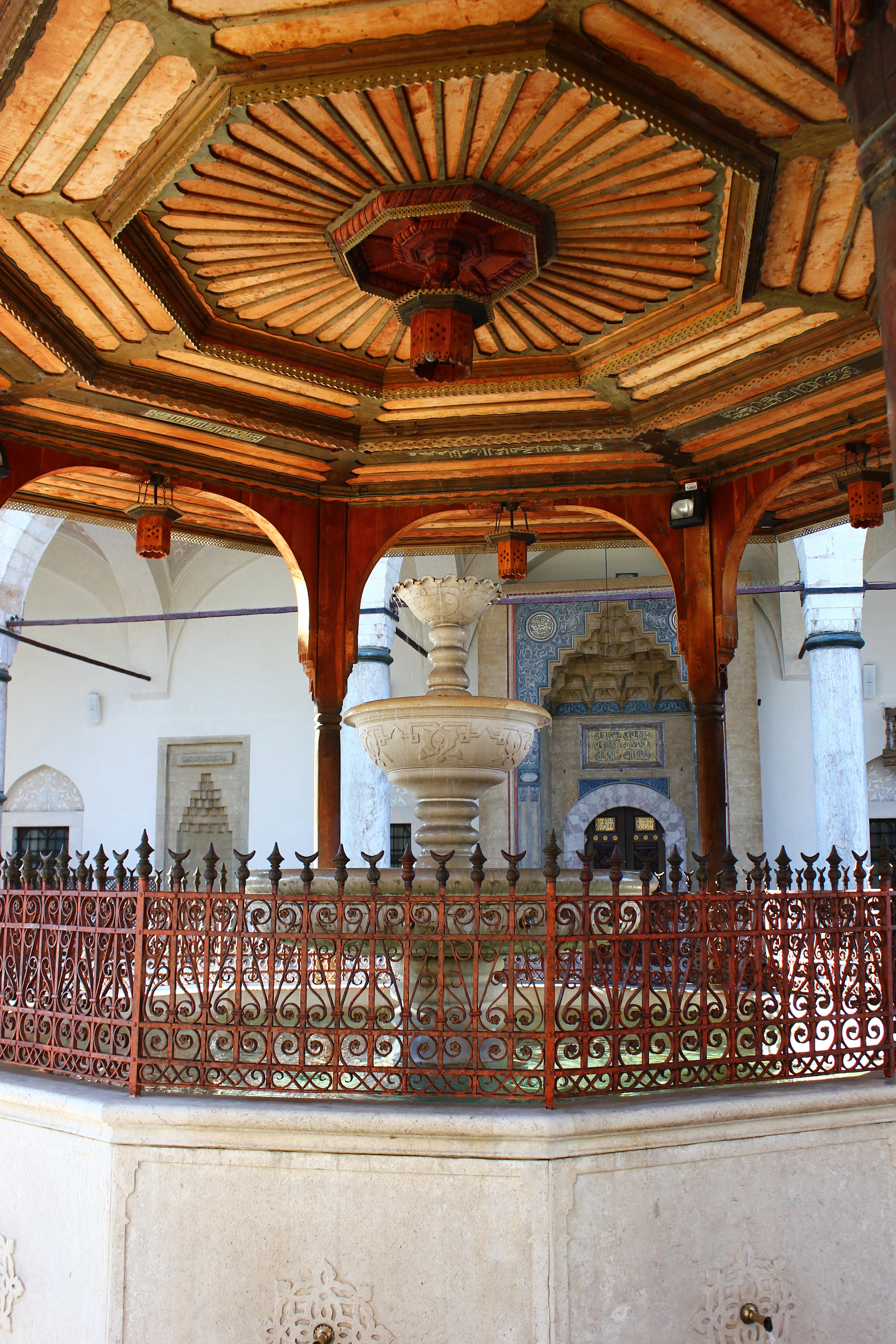
The fountain in the sahn

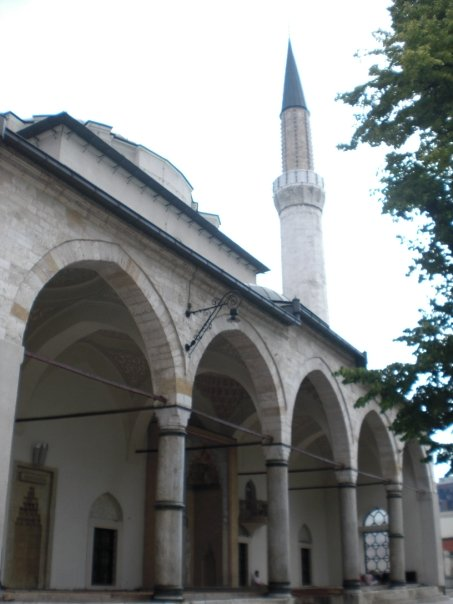
Gazi Husrev-beg Mosque's portico with 5 elegant islamic arches

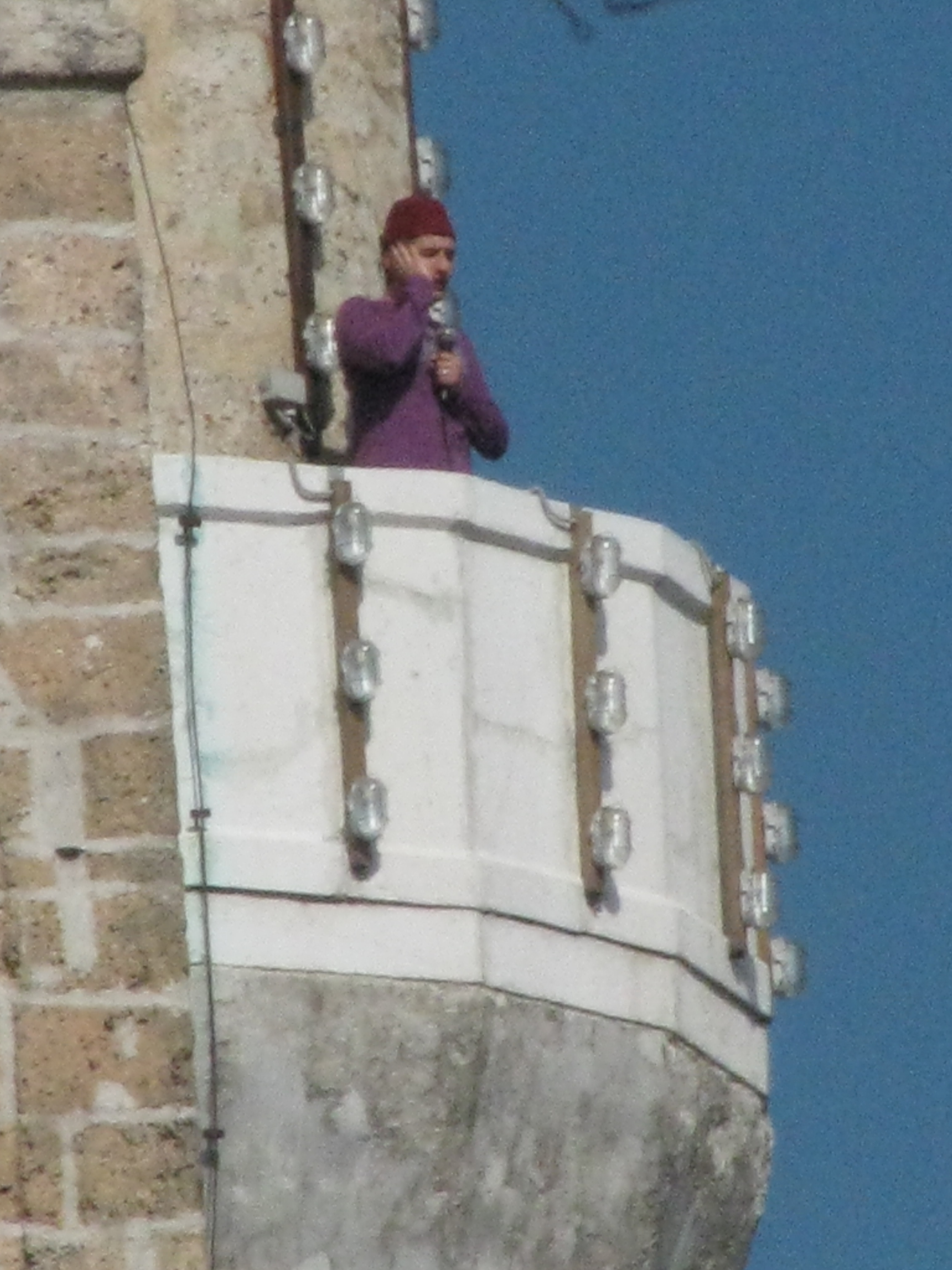
Muezzin reciting the adhan

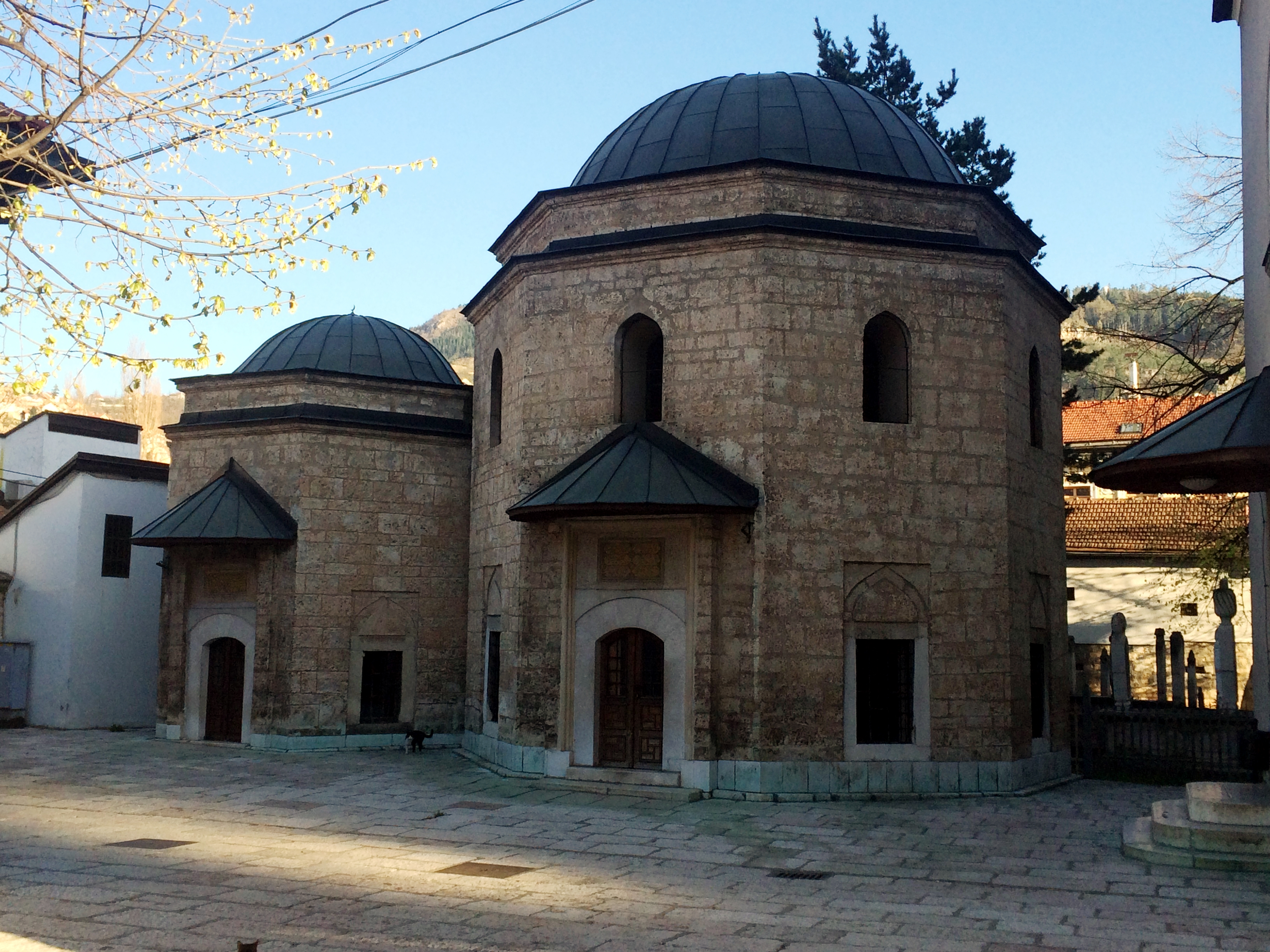
Gazi Husrev-bey's turbe (mausoleum)

== See also ==
- Timeline of Islamic history
- Islam in Bosnia and Herzegovina
- List of mosques in Bosnia and Herzegovina
