= Green Tomb =

Mausoleum in Turkey

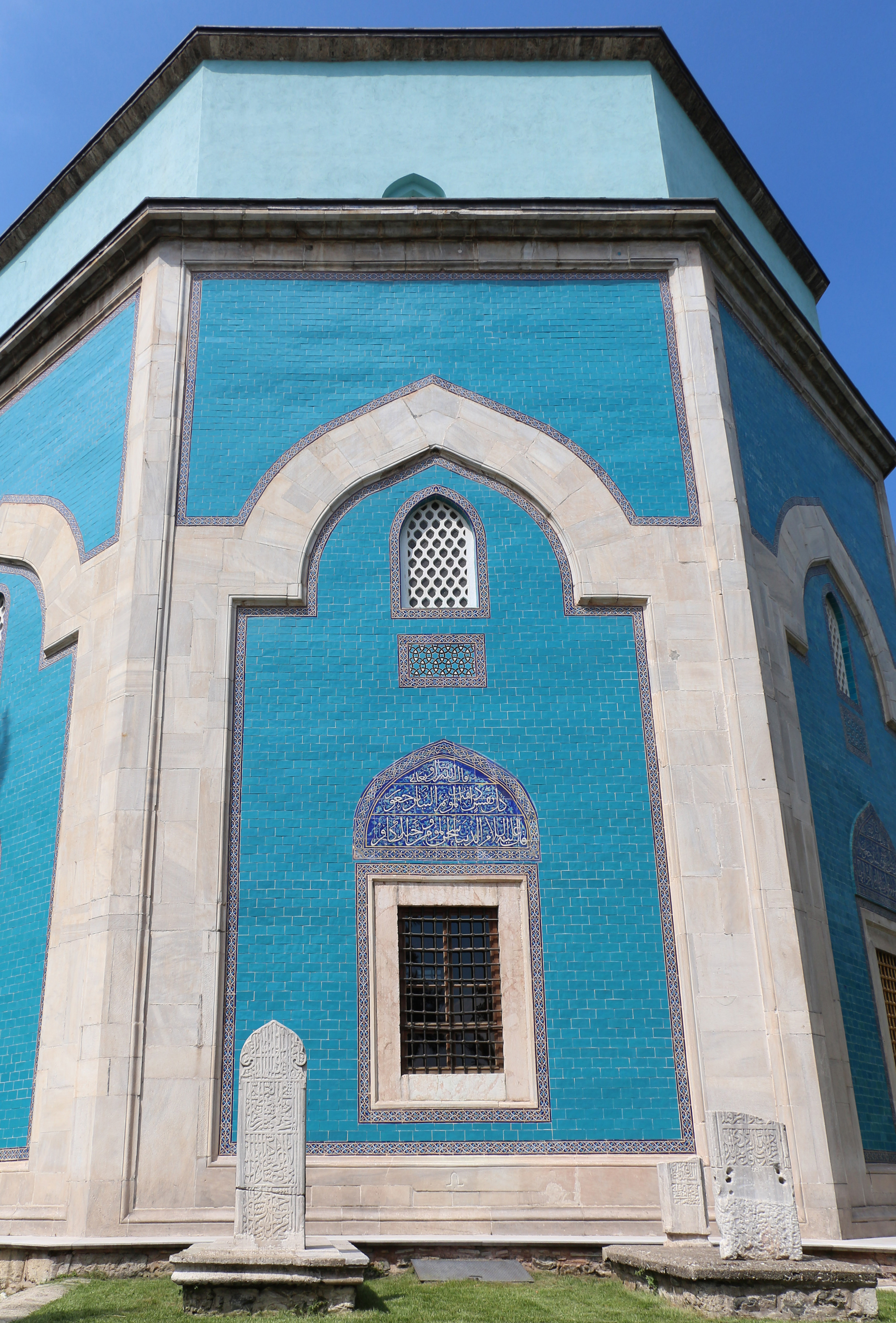
- Green Tomb (Yeşil Türbe)

Religion
- Affiliation: Islam

Location
- Location: Bursa, Turkey
- Interactive map of Green Tomb
- Coordinates: 40°10′53″N 29°04′29″E

Architecture
- Type: Türbe
- Style: Islamic, Ottoman architecture
- Completed: 1421

Specifications
- Dome height (outer): 25 m
- Materials: stone, tiles, marble

The Green Tomb (Turkish: Yeşil Türbe) is a mausoleum of the fifth Ottoman Sultan, Mehmed I, in Bursa, Turkey. It was built by Mehmed's son and successor Murad II following the death of the sovereign in 1421. The architect Hacı Ivaz Pasha designed the tomb and the Yeşil Mosque opposite to it.

In addition to the sultan's sarcophagus, it contains seven other tombs: those of his sons Mustafa, Mahmud and Yusuf, his daughters Selçuk, Ayşe and Sitti and his wet nurse (Daye Hatun).

== Architecture ==
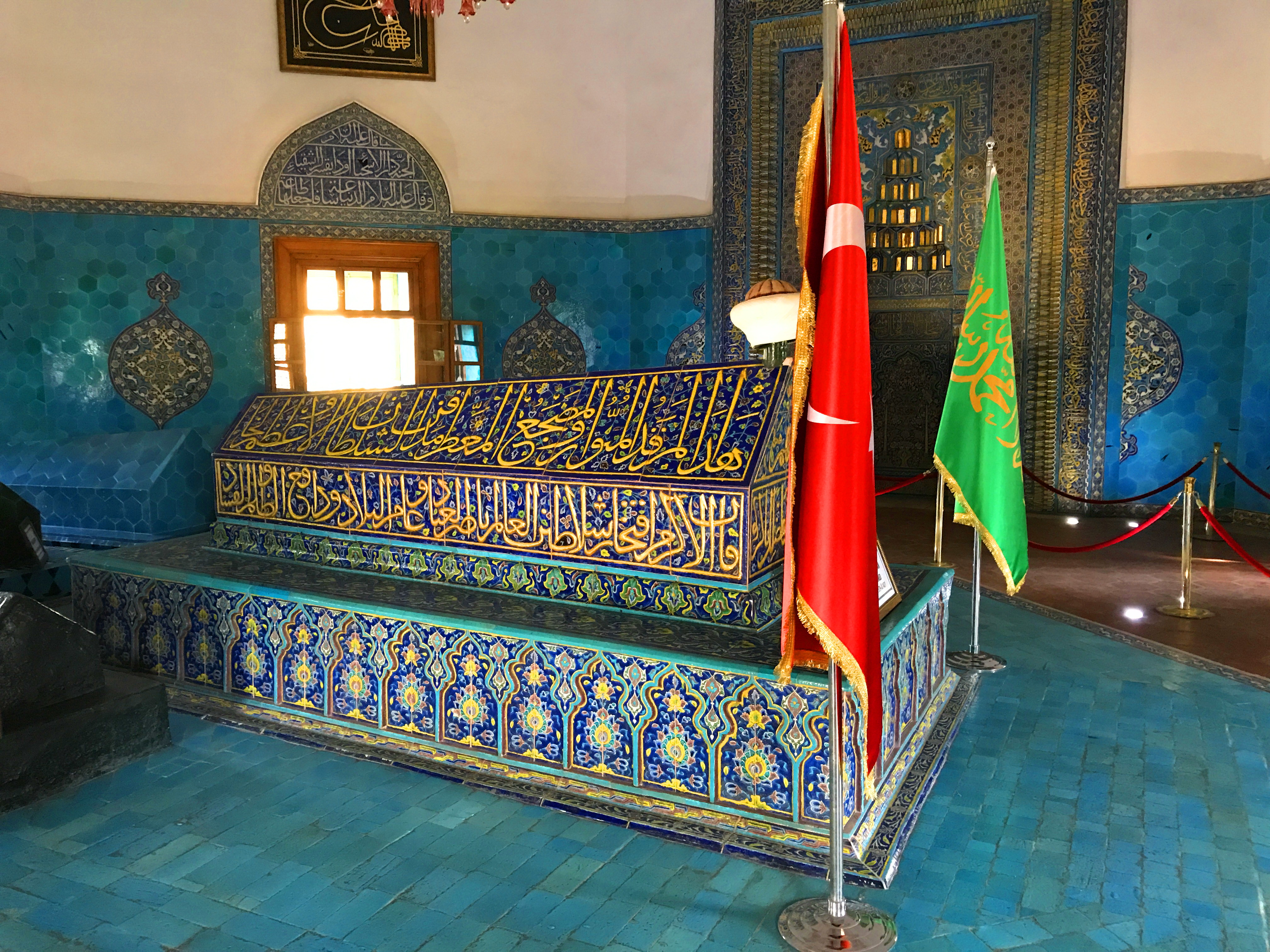
Green Mosque of Bursa

Set amid cypresses on top of the hill in the Yeşil neighborhood in Bursa, the mausoleum stands higher than the rest of the complex. It is built on a hexagonal plan and crowned with a hemi-spherical dome. The exterior of the mausoleum is clad with the green-blue tiles that give it its name. A majority of the tiles were replaced by contemporary Kütahya tiles following damage in the 1855 Bursa earthquake. The entry portal is crowned with a semi-umbrella vault and has muqarnas niches above marble seats on both side of the entrance. İznik tiles with flower patterns in blue, white and yellow adorn the portal.

Inside, past the carved wooden doors, the royal catafalque stands on a platform at the center surrounded by seven other tombs. It is richly decorated with scriptures and flower designs painted in yellow, white and blue glazed tiles. The lower section of walls is lined with blue-green tiles, also used in tympana of windows on the interior. The muqarnas niche of mihrab on the qibla wall is also set in a large frame of ornamental tilework: the mosaic of tiles inside the niche depicts a garden of roses, carnations and hyacinths. The chandelier and the colored glass windows are later additions.

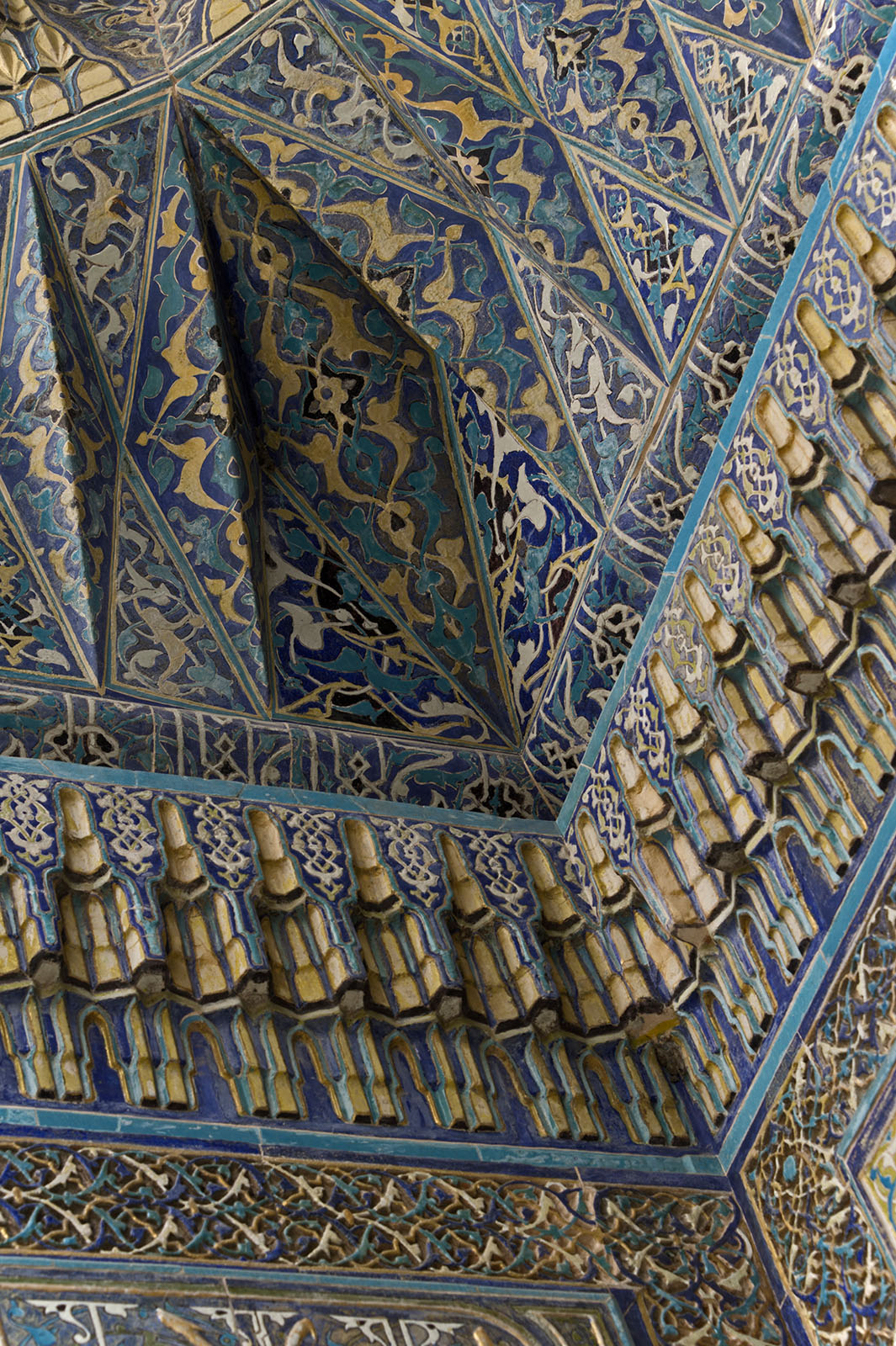
Decoration above entrance

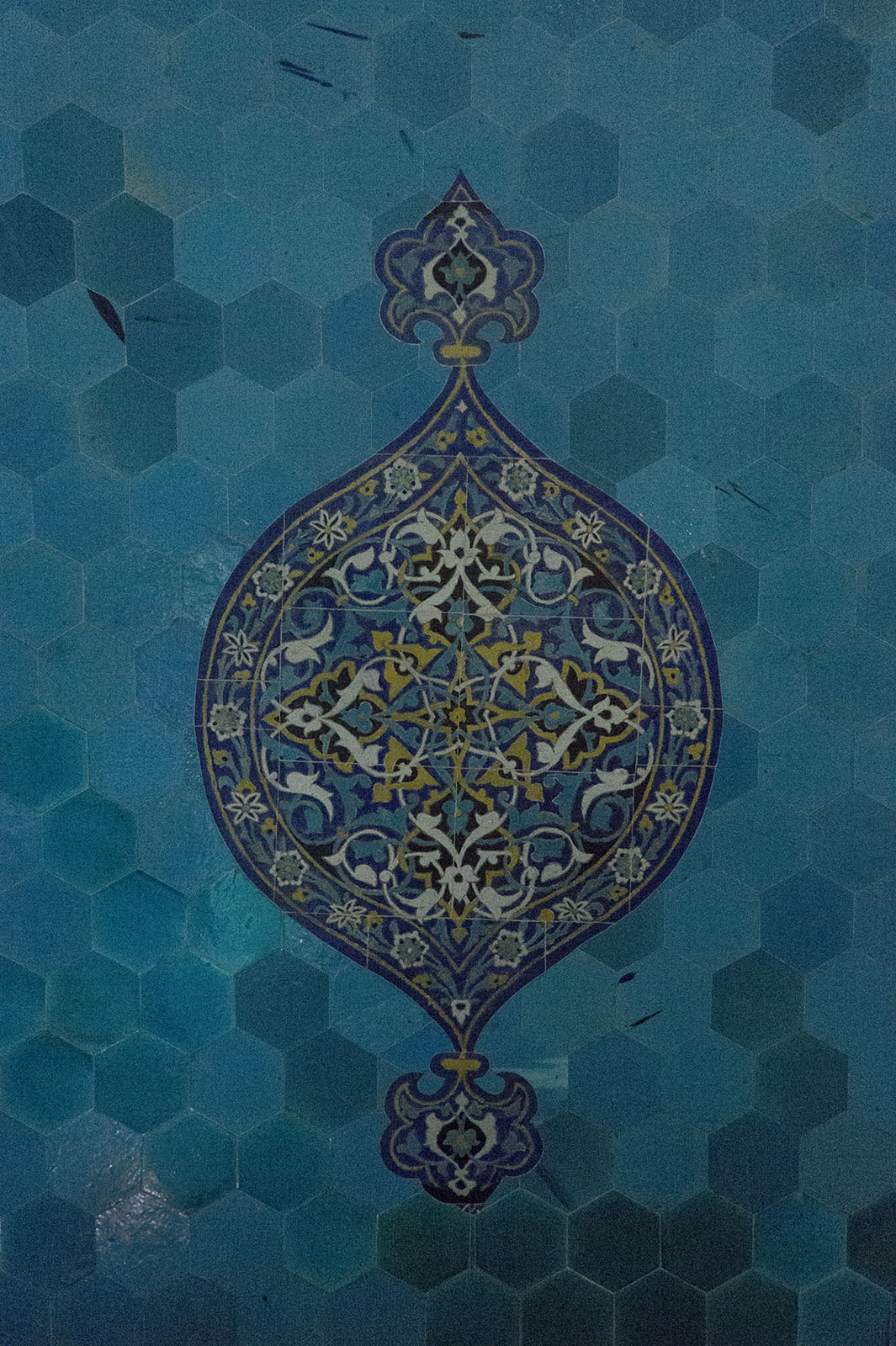
Decoration on the wall

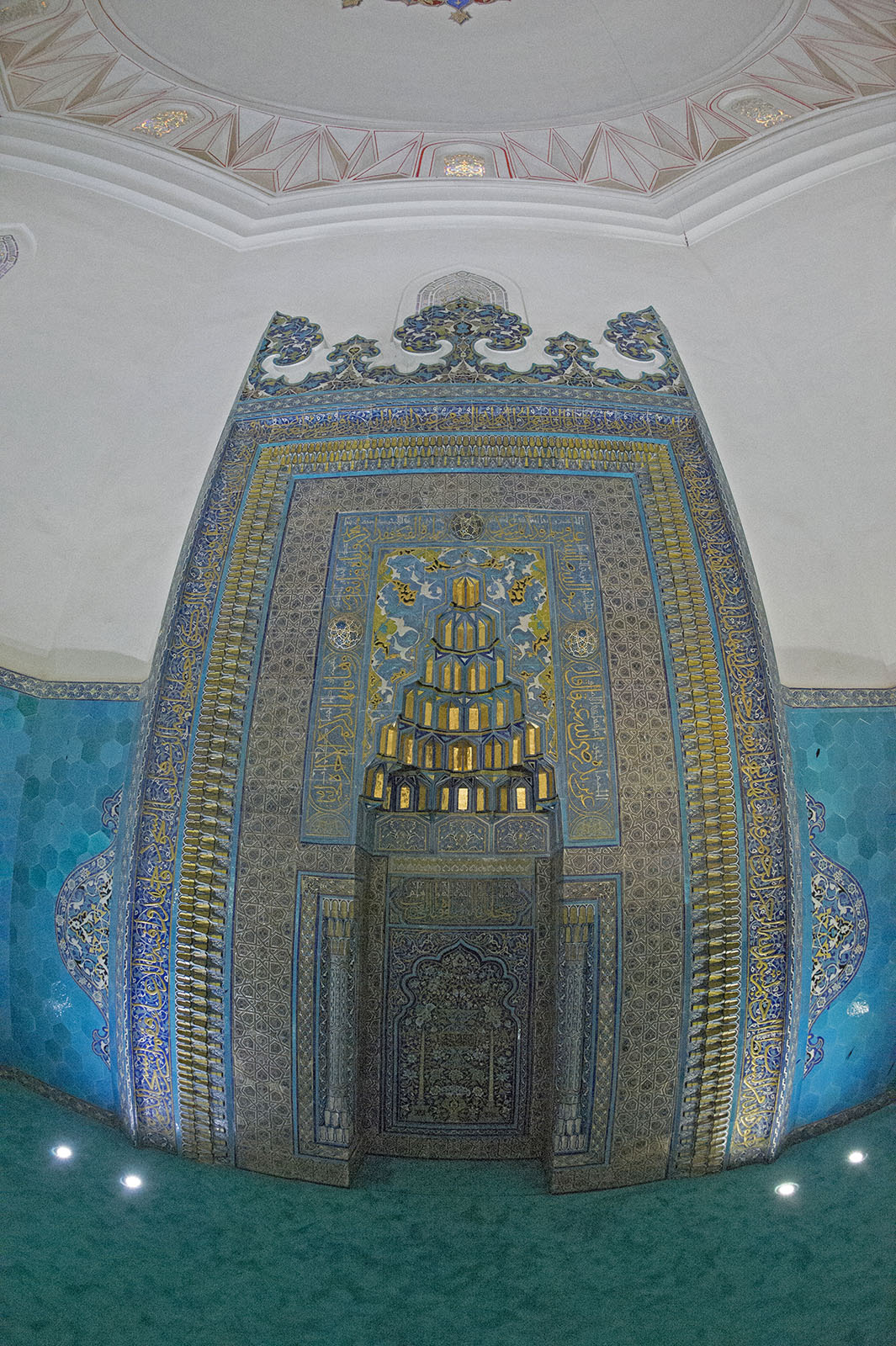
Mihrab and part of dome

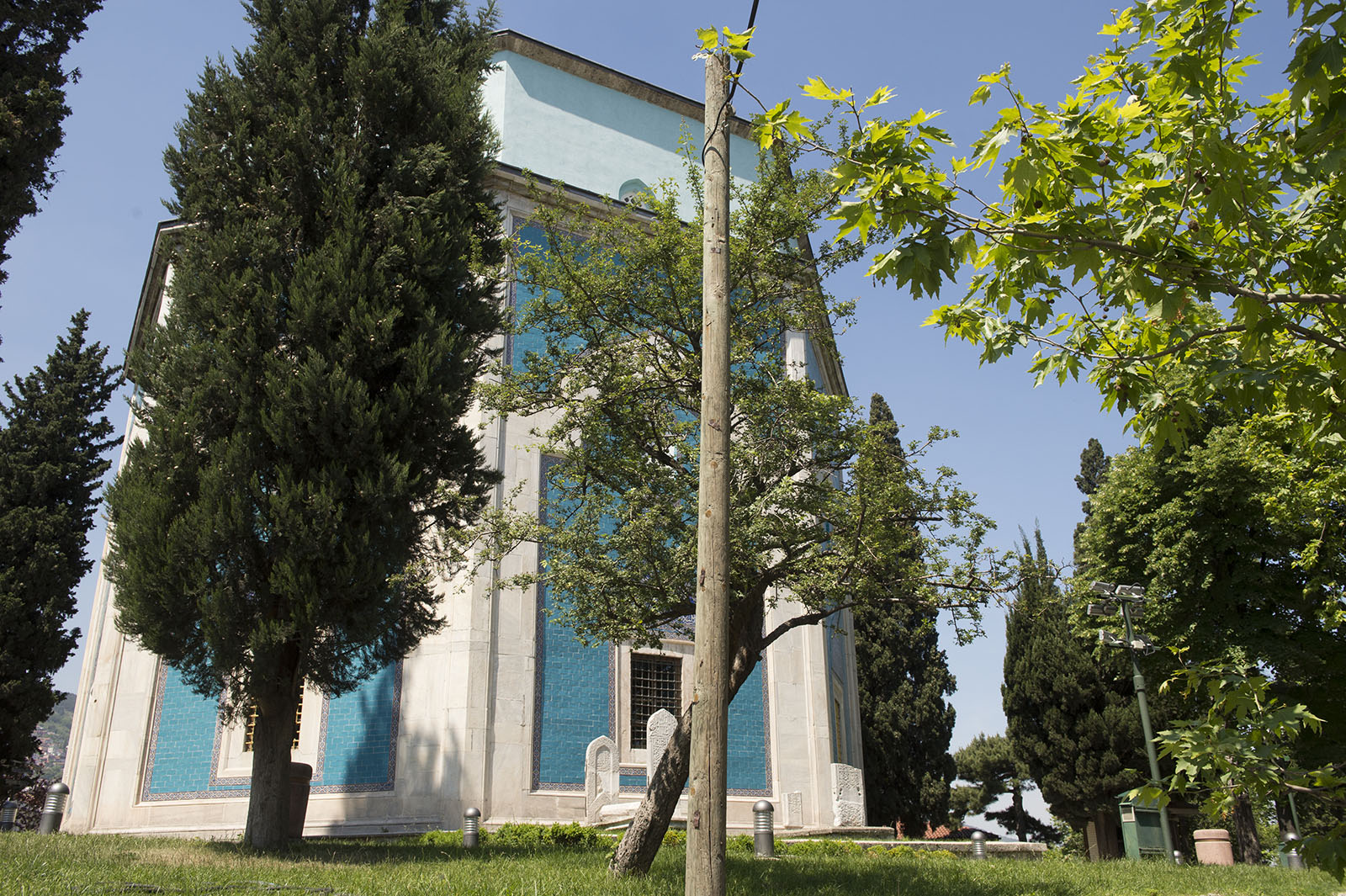
Green Tomb from outside

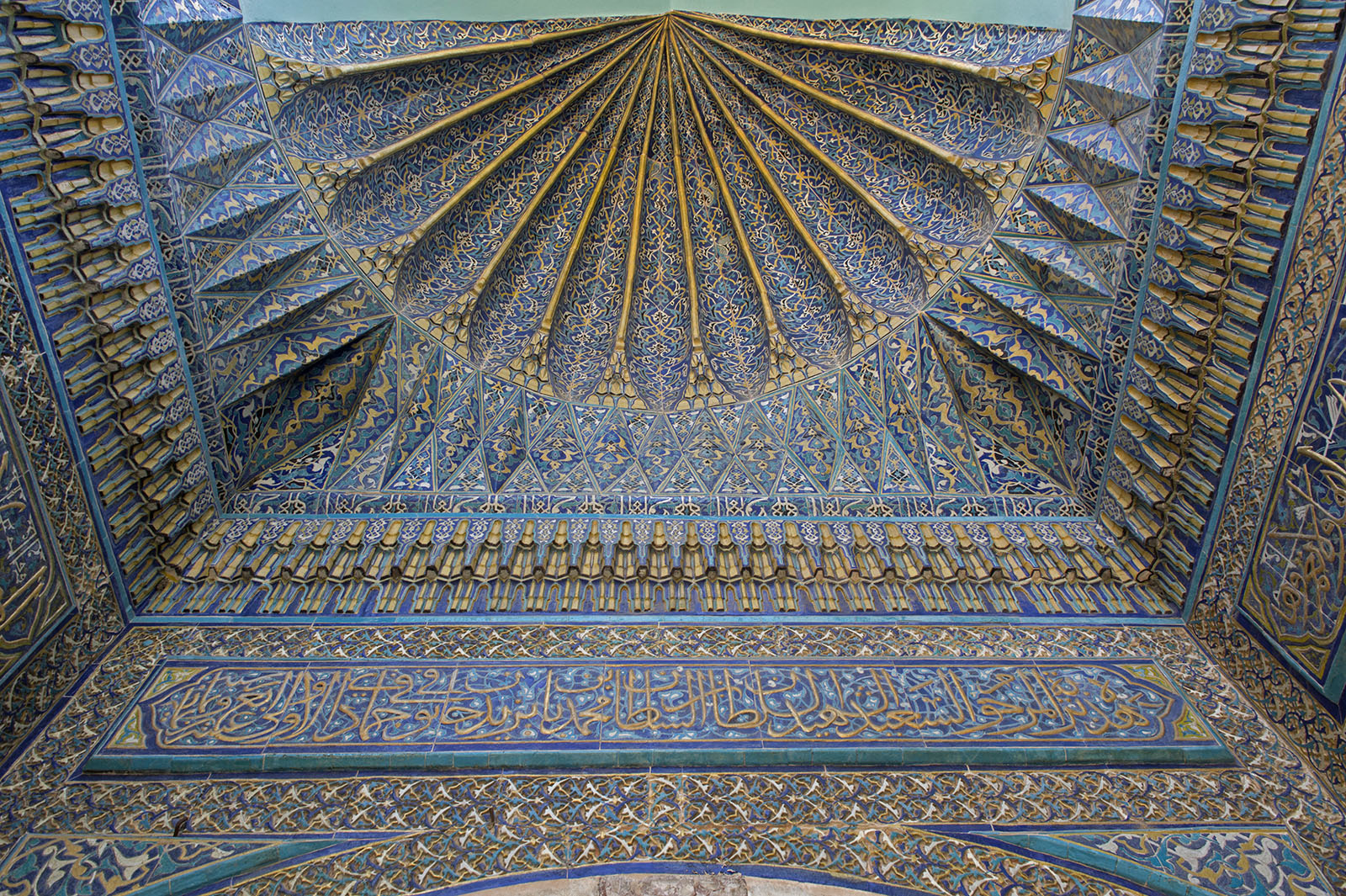
Above entrance to tomb

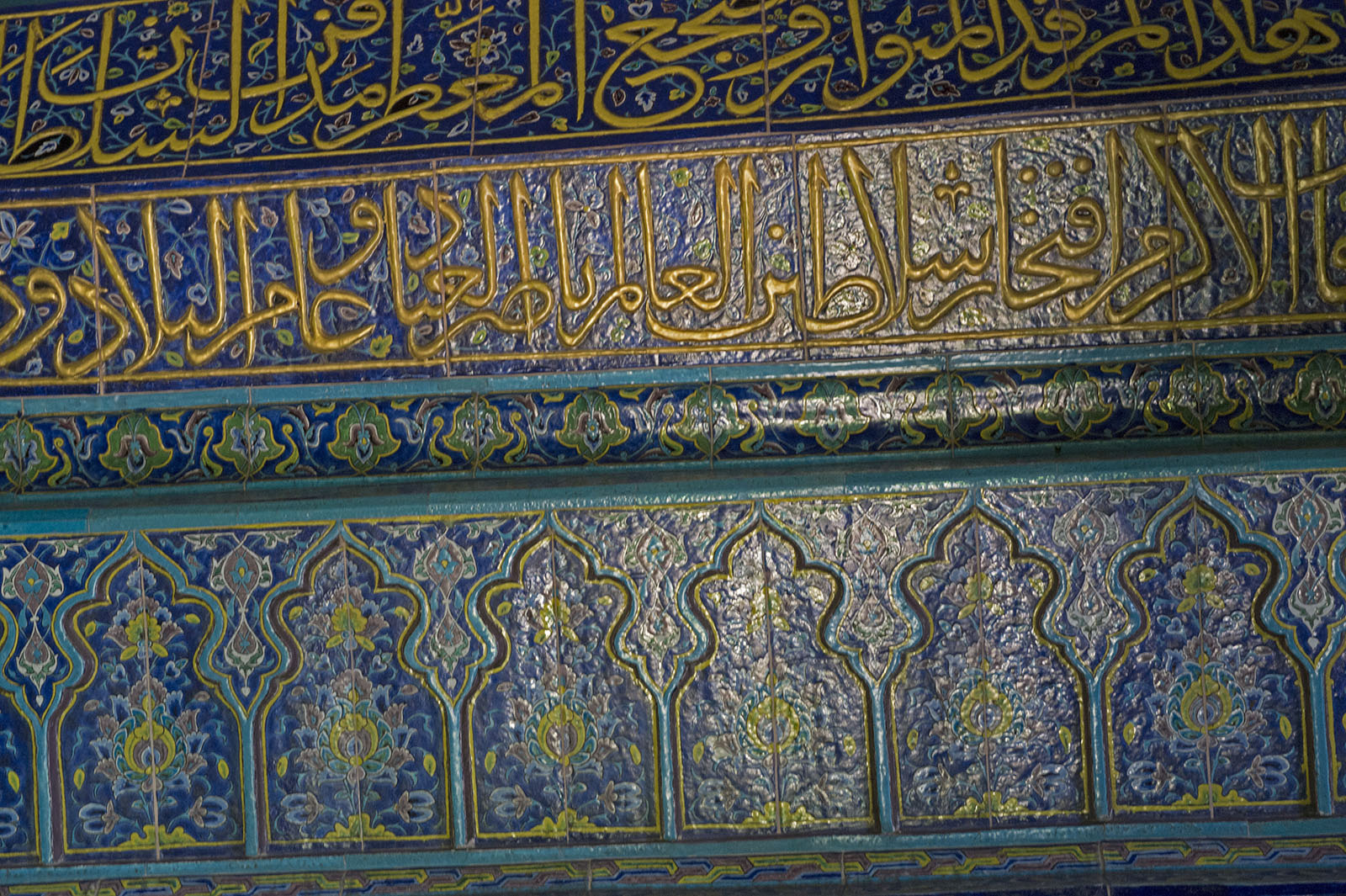
Grave of Mehmet I

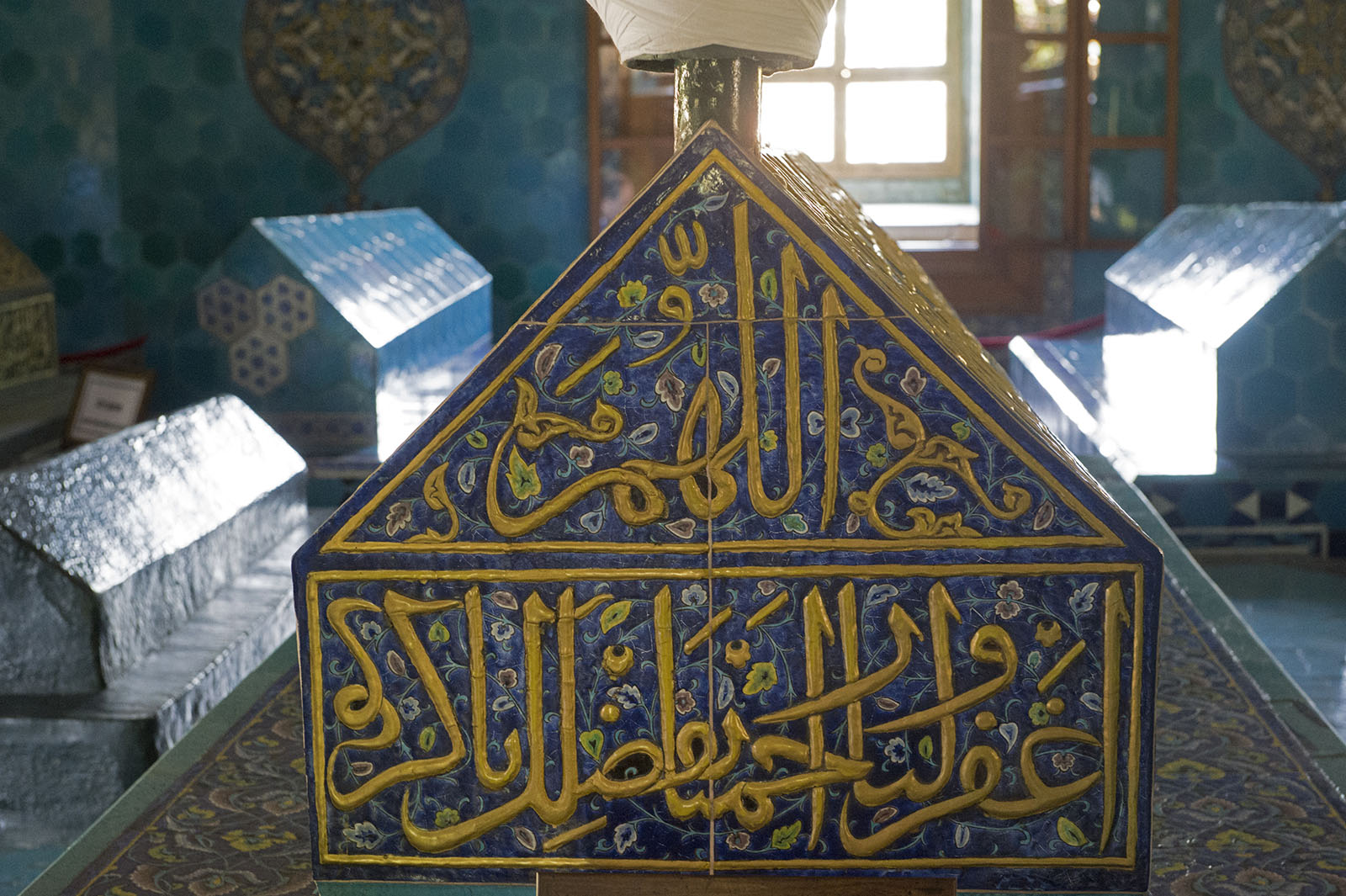
Top side of grave of Mehmet I

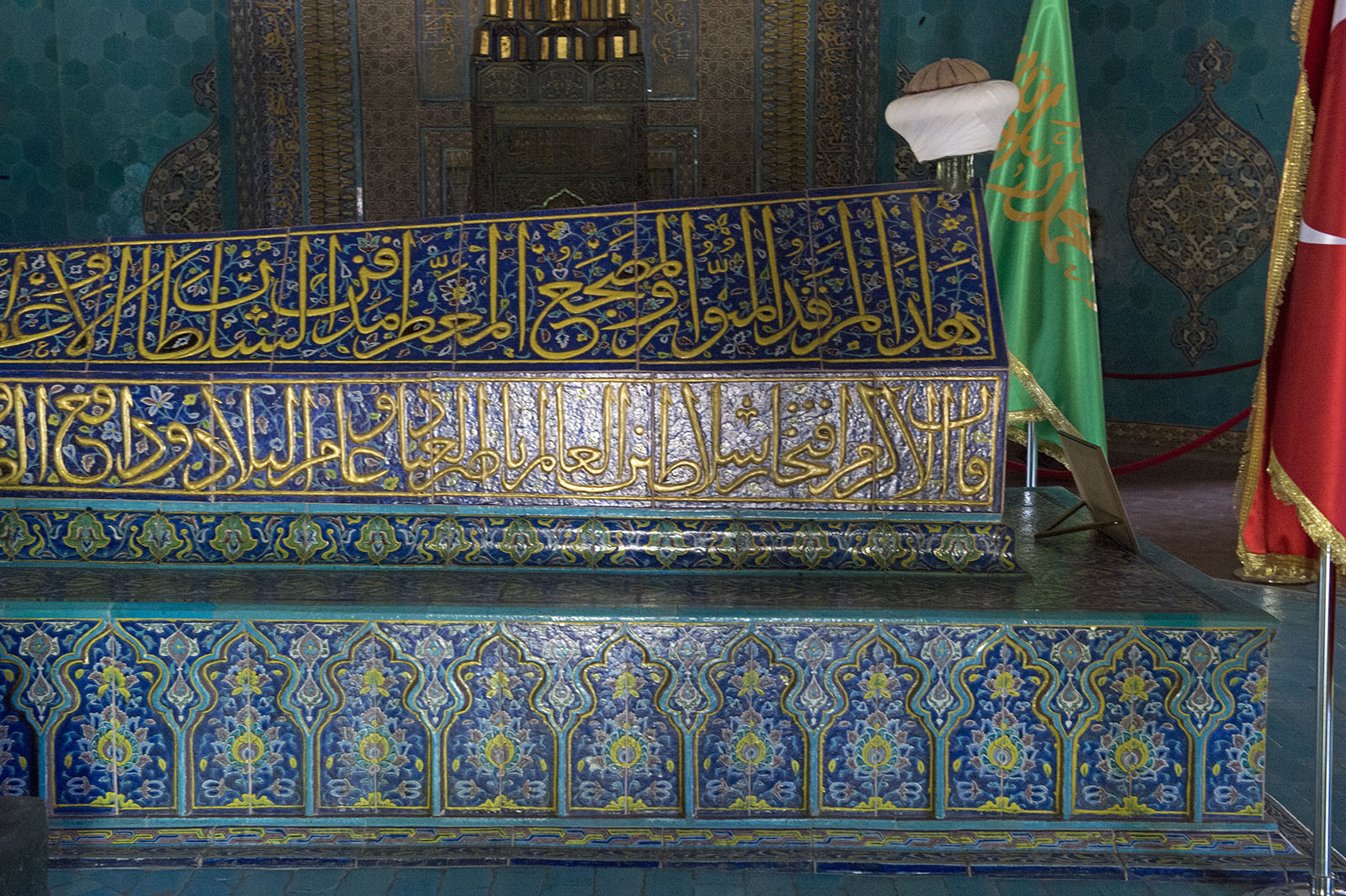
Grave of Mehmet I in the Green Tomb

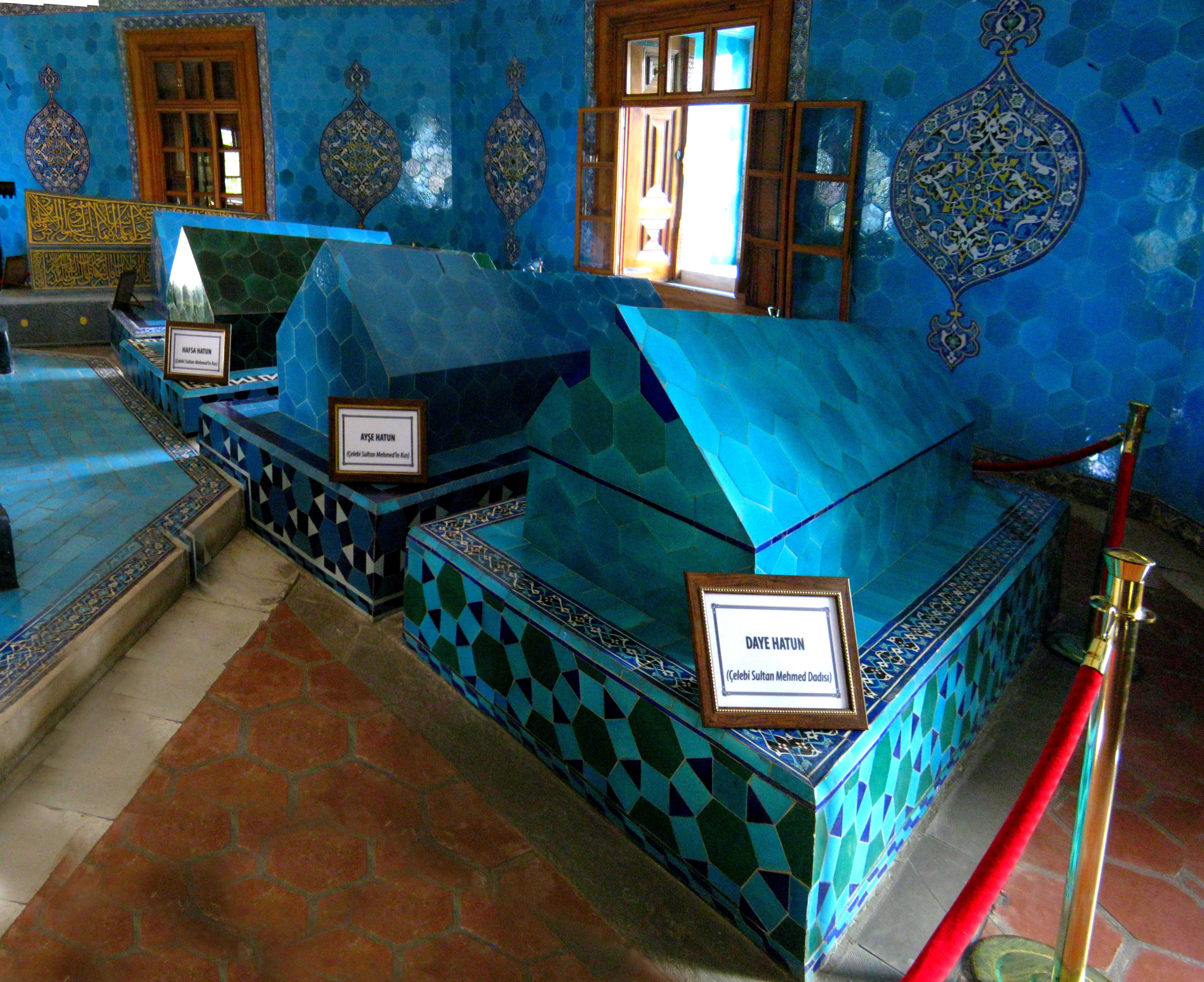

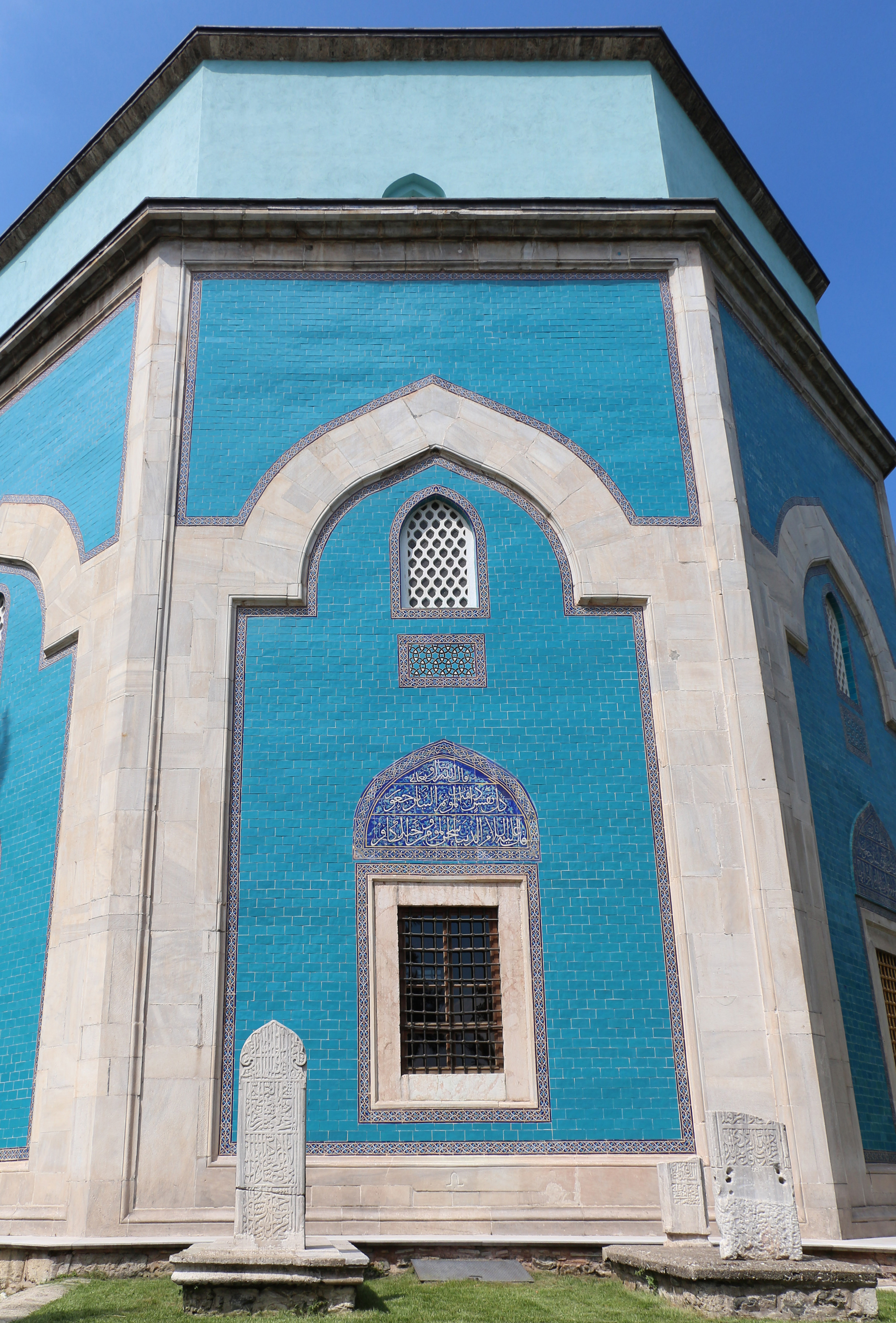

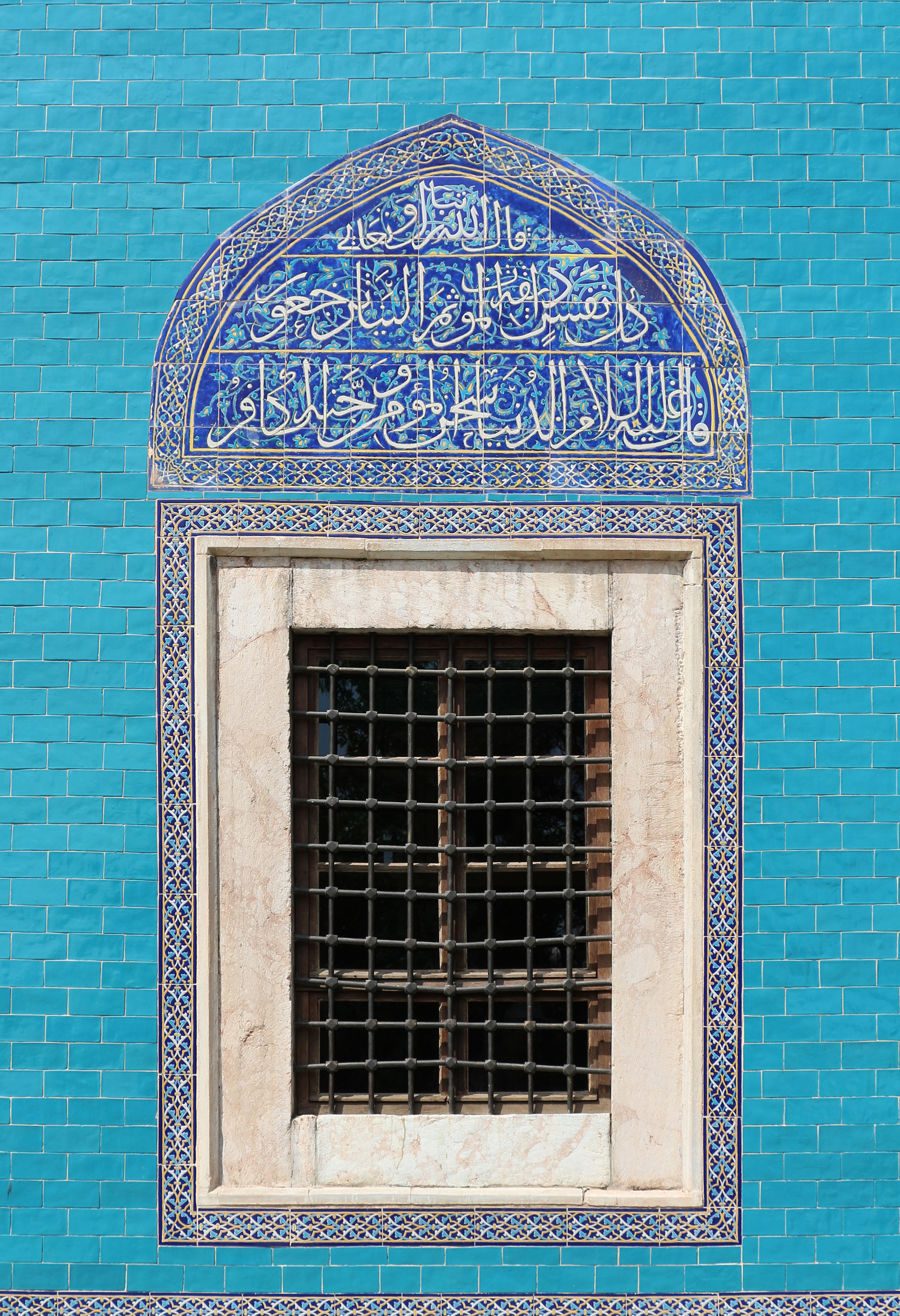

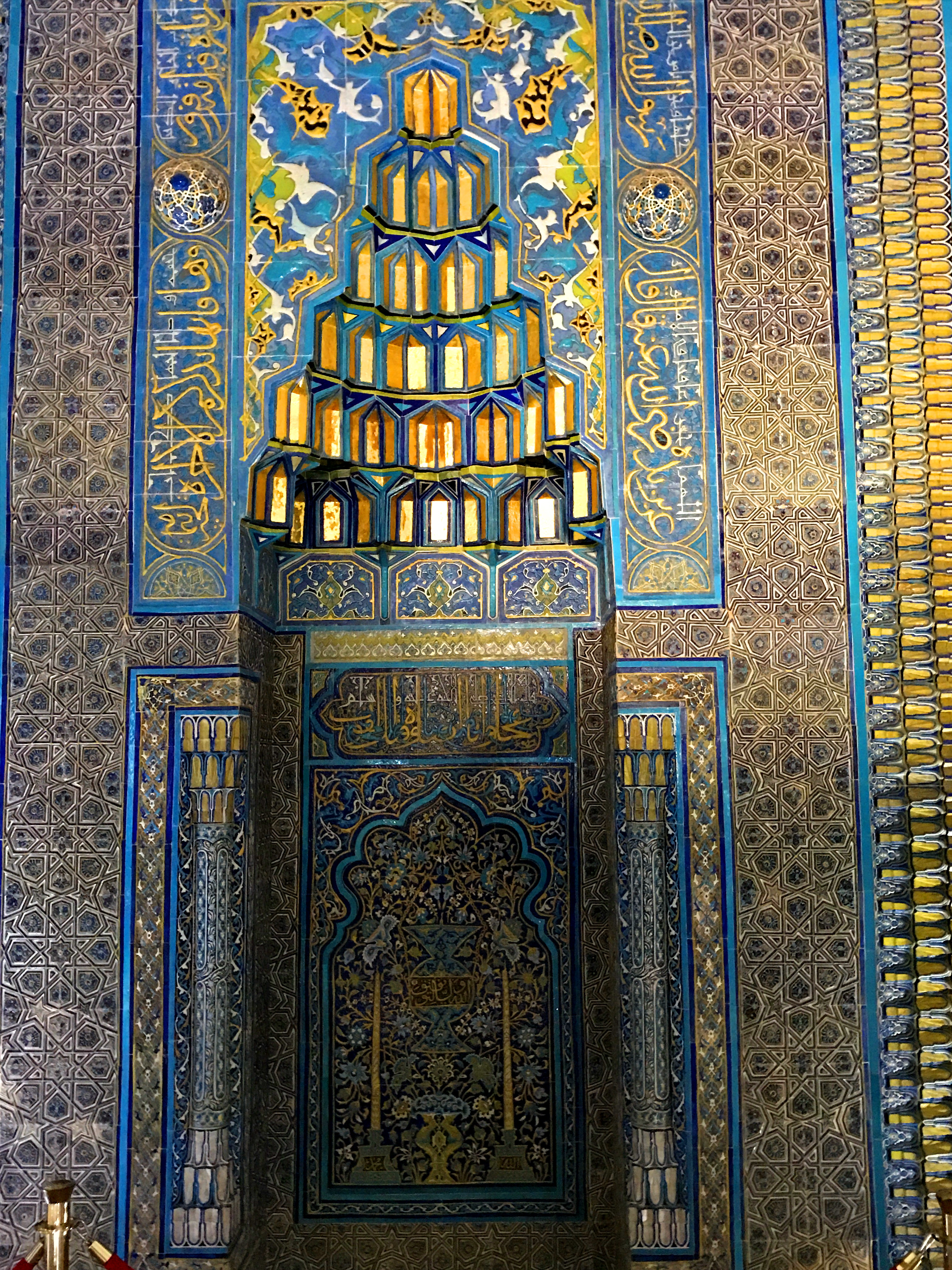

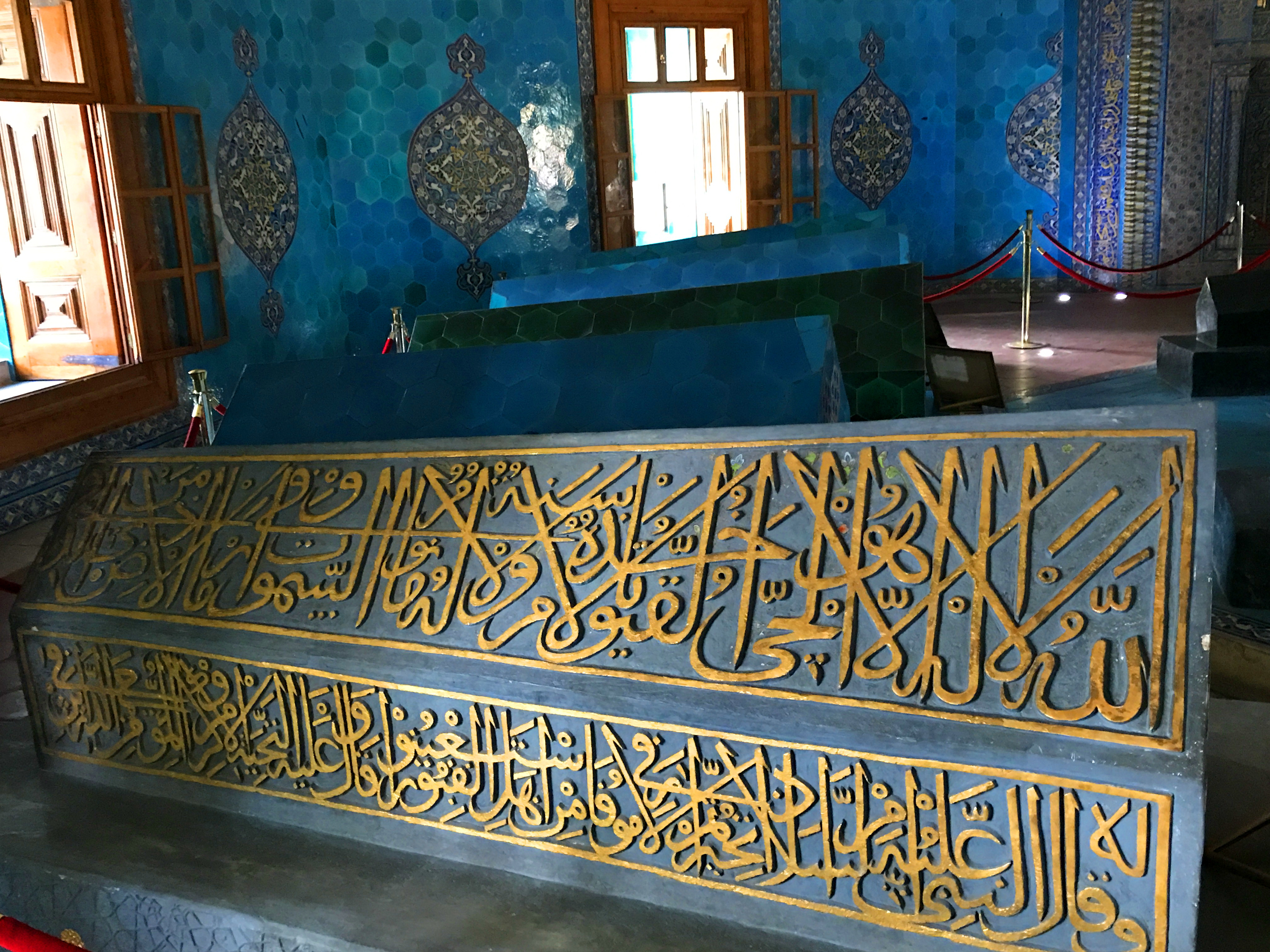

== See also ==
- Ali Tabrizi
