= Türbe =

Ottoman mausoleum

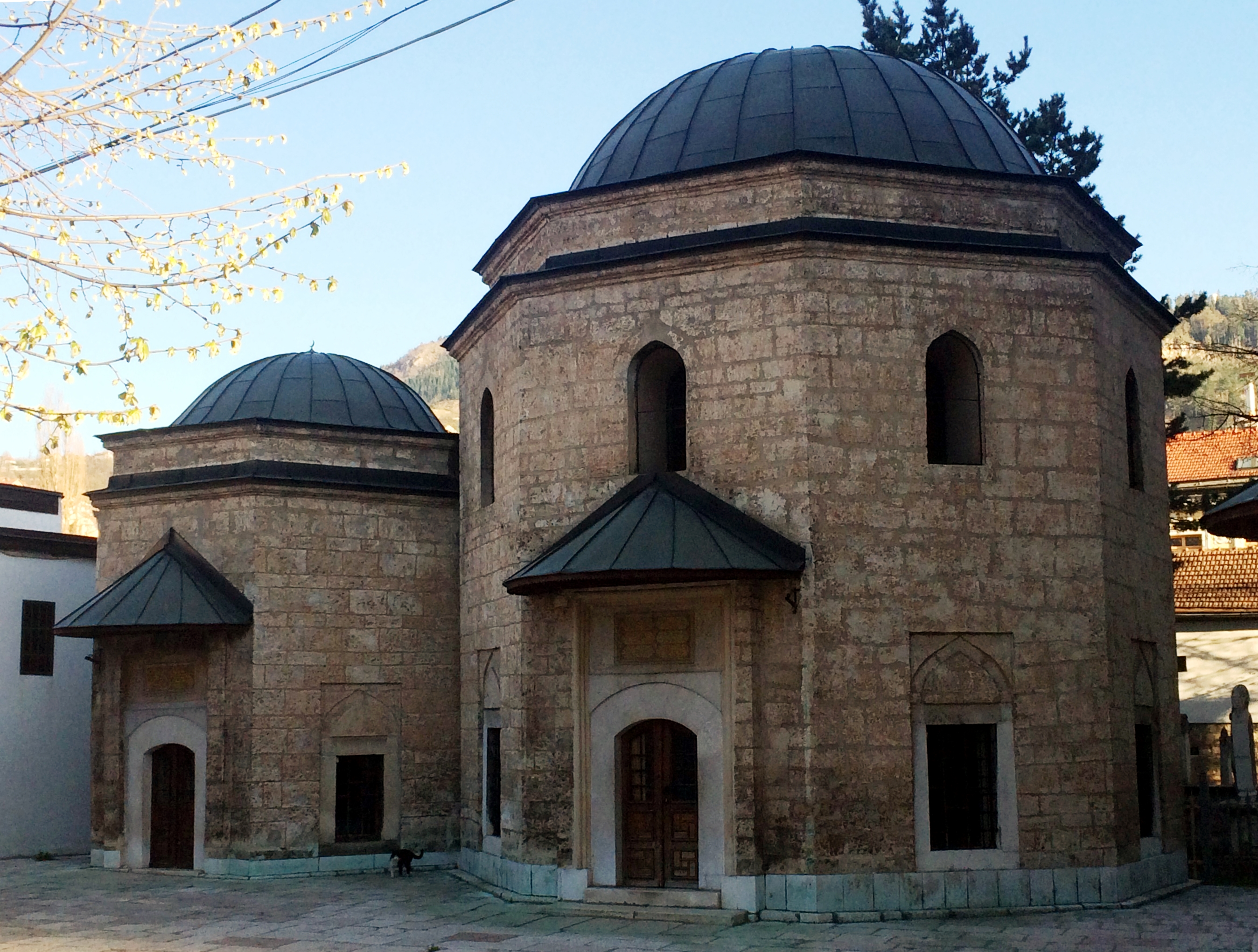
The türbe of Gazi Husrev-beg (1480–1541) at the Gazi Husrev-beg Mosque in Sarajevo, Bosnia and Herzegovina

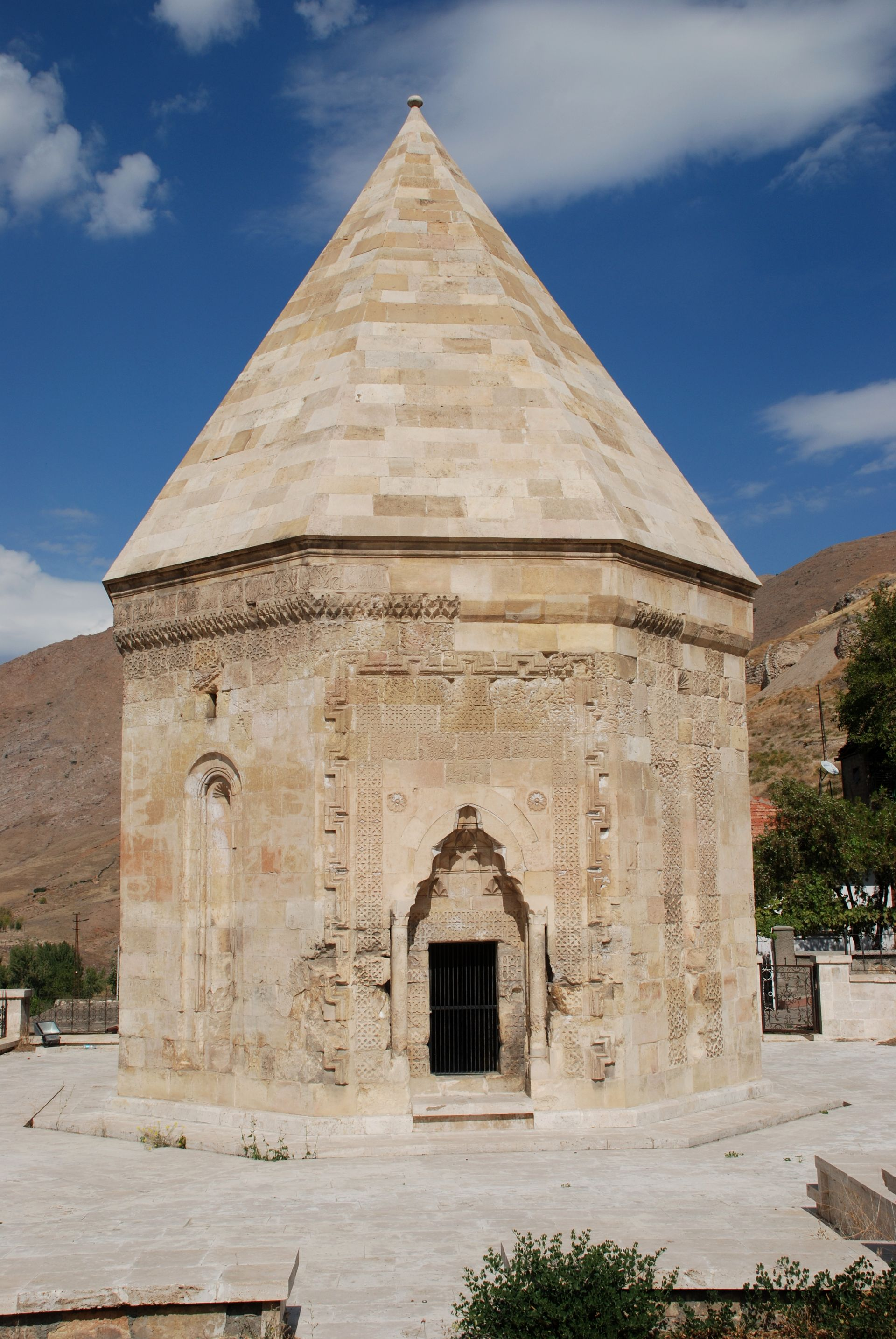
Earlier and more eastern examples have straight-sided roofs rather than domes, a Persian style. Divriği, Sivas Province, in central eastern Turkey, 13th century.

The Grand Vizier's türbes in the heart of Travnik, Bosnia and Herzegovina

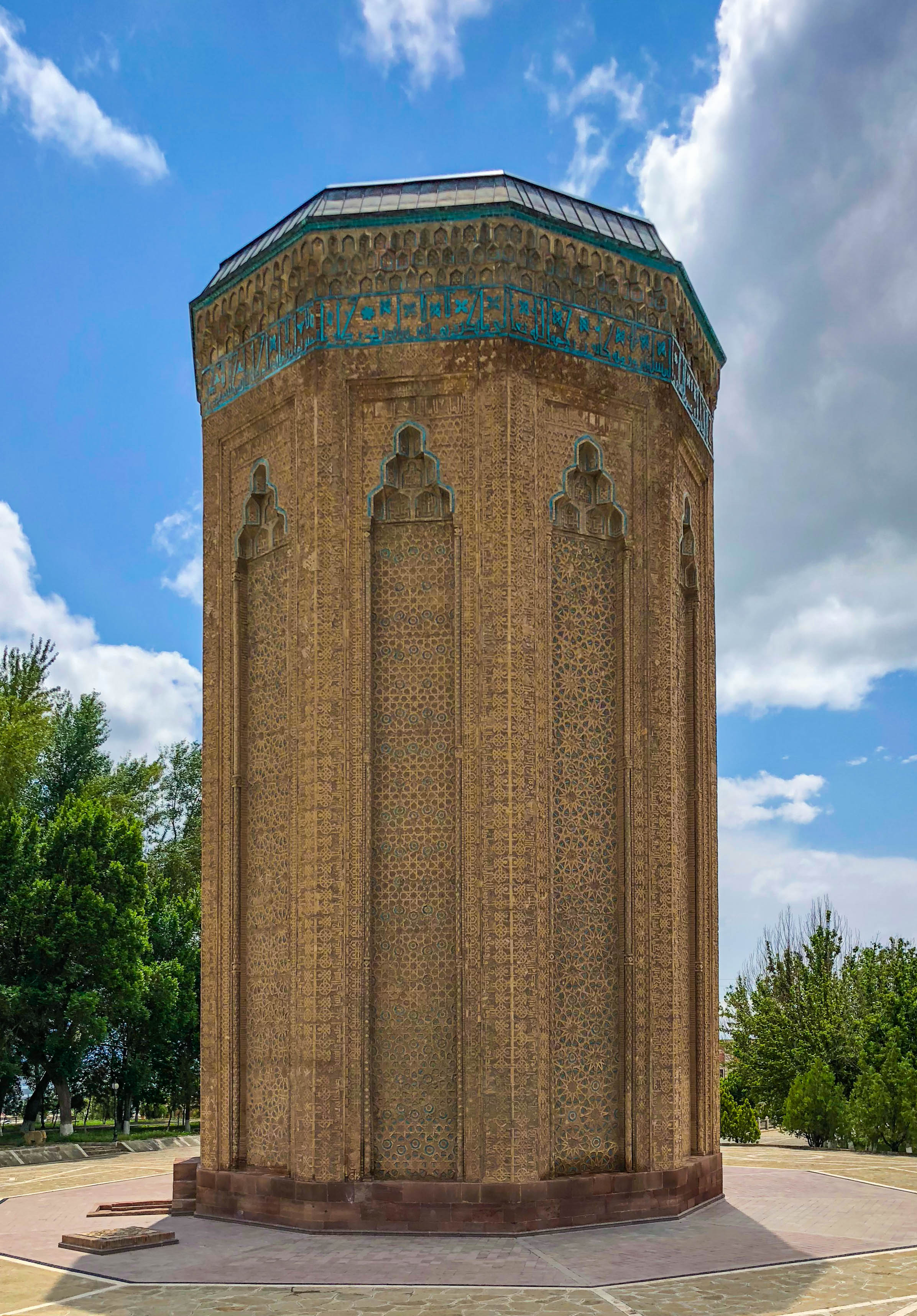
Momine Khatun Mausoleum in Nakhchivan (1186–1187)

Türbe refers to a Muslim mausoleum, tomb or grave often in the Turkish-speaking areas and for the mausolea of Ottoman sultans, nobles and notables. A typical türbe is located in the grounds of a mosque or complex, often endowed by the deceased. However, some are more closely integrated into surrounding buildings.

Many are relatively small buildings, often domed and hexagonal or octagonal in shape, containing a single chamber. More minor türbes are usually kept closed although the interior can be sometimes be glimpsed through metal grilles over the windows or door. The exterior is typically masonry, perhaps with tiled decoration over the doorway, but the interior often contains large areas of painted tilework, which may be of the highest quality.

Inside, the body or bodies repose in plain sarcophagi, perhaps with a simple inscription, which are, or were originally, covered by rich cloth drapes. Usually these sarcophagi are symbolic, and the actual body lies below the floor. At the head of the tomb a wooden pole was sometimes surmounted by a white cloth Ottoman turban (for men) or by a turban carved in stone.

Earlier examples often had two or more storeys, following the example of the Ilkhanate and Persian tombs on which they were modelled; the Malek Tomb is a good example of this. The Ottoman style is also supposed to reflect the shape of the tents used by the earlier nomadic Ottomans and their successors when on military campaigns. Sultans often had their tombs built during their lifetimes, although those of other family members (and some sultans) were constructed after their deaths. The vital organs of Sultan Murad I, assassinated just after his victory at the Battle of Kosovo in 1389, were buried in a türbe there while the rest of his body was carried back to his capital at Bursa to be buried in a second türbe.

== Etymology ==
The word is derived from the Arabic تُرْبَة turbah (meaning "soil/ground/earth"), which can also mean a mausoleum, but more often a funerary complex, or a plot in a cemetery.

== Famous türbes ==
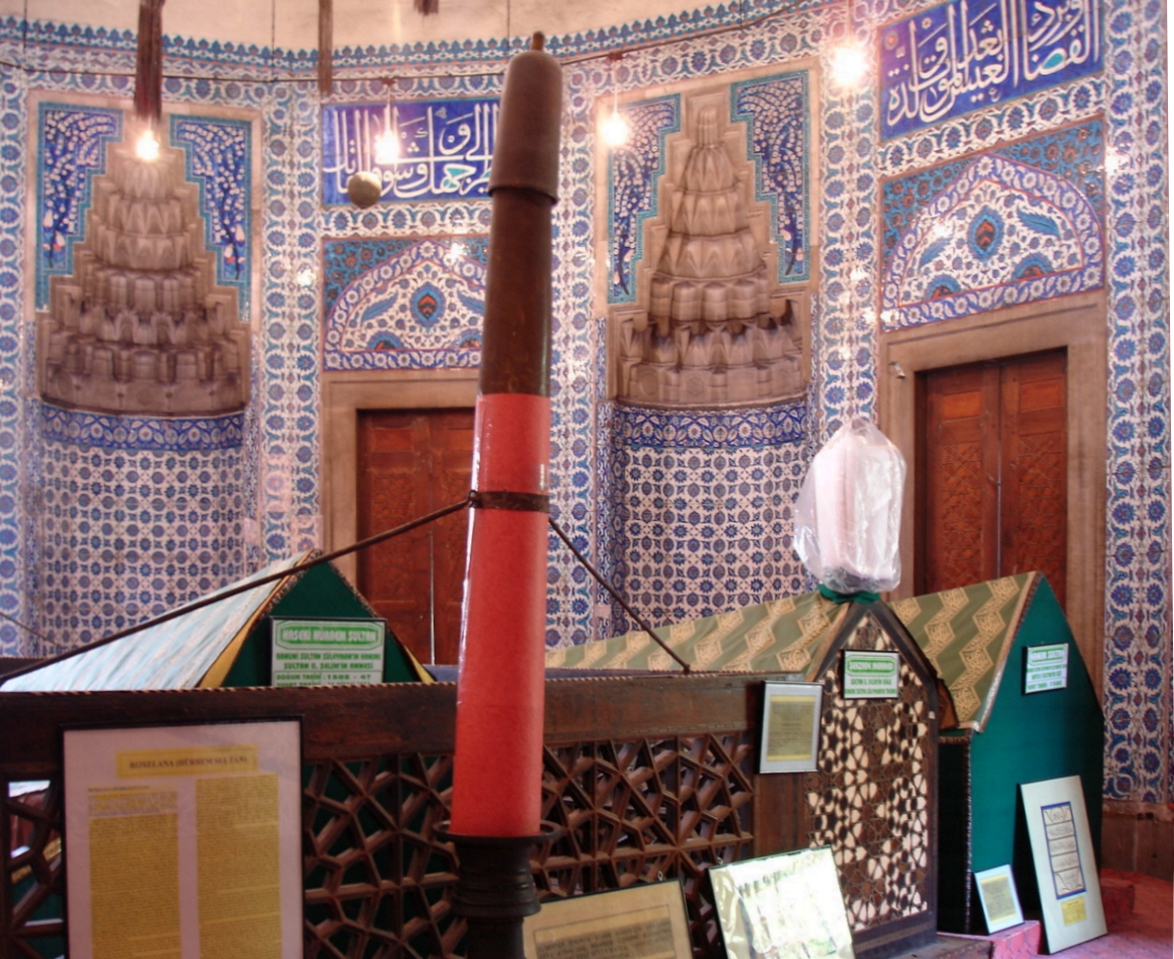
The türbe of Hürrem Sultan (died 1558) at the Süleymaniye Mosque in Istanbul, Turkey, showing tiling, draped sarcophagi, one empty turban pole, and one with a turban (protected by plastic wrapping)

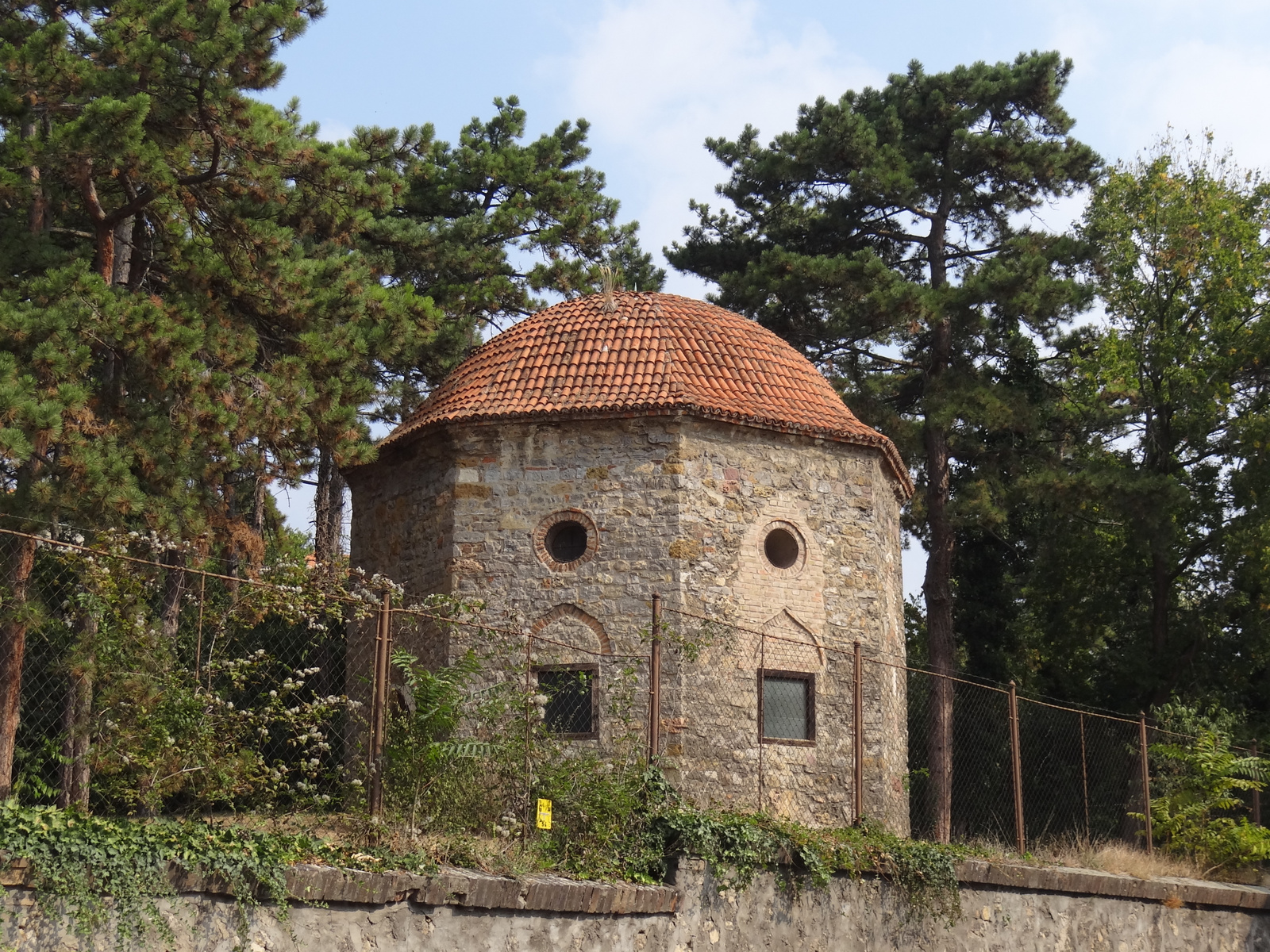
The türbe of Idrisz Baba in Pécs, Hungary

Damat Ali-Paša's Turbeh in Belgrade's Kalemegdan fortress (Serbia), note the hexagonal base

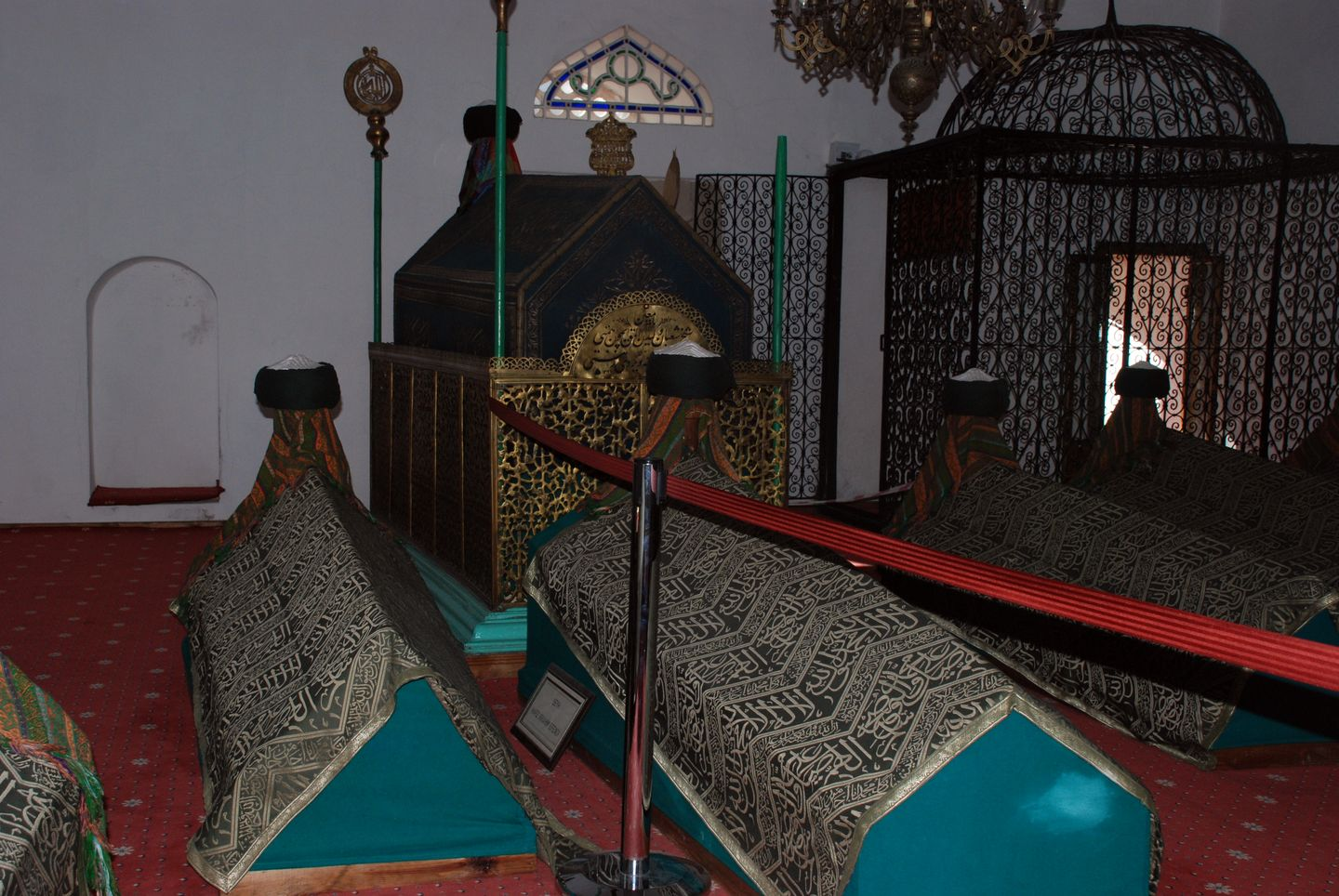
Sarcophagi inside the türbe of Sheikh Shaban-i Veli, Sufi master of the Halveti tariqa, in Kastamonu, Turkey

Istanbul is home to the türbes of most of the Ottoman sultans as well as to many of the grand viziers and other notables. Turkey also has türbes associated with several Sufi saints of the Ottoman Empire.

=== Süleymaniye Mosque complex ===
The Süleymaniye Mosque complex in Istanbul includes some of the most famous türbes, including that of Suleyman himself (1550s) – perhaps the most splendid of all Ottoman türbes – and that of his wife Hürrem Sultan, with some extremely fine tilework. In a street close to the complex is the small türbe of its famous architect Mimar Sinan, in what was his garden.

=== Konya ===
In Konya the grounds of the 12th-century Alâeddin Mosque contain two conical-roofed early türbes containing the remains of members of the Seljuk Rum dynasty. The town is also home to the türbe of Jalal ad-Din Muhammad Rumi, which is a major shrine and pilgrimage point. In Konya, as in Kayseri, türbes are also referred to as Kümbets.

=== Bursa ===
The Ottoman capital before the conquest of Constantinople in 1453, Bursa is home to the türbes of most of the earlier sultans including Osman I and his son, Orhan. Türbes in the grounds of the lovely Muradiye Complex contain the remains of Murad II and several princes. The Yeşil Türbe (Green Türbe), a large three-story tower in the grounds of the Yeşil Mosque, houses the beautifully tiled sarcophagus of Mehmed I. Much of its exterior is covered with plain blue tiles, despite the name of the tomb suggesting that they are green.

=== Bulgaria ===
In Bulgaria, the heptagonal türbes of dervish saints such as Kıdlemi Baba, Ak Yazılı Baba, Demir Baba and Otman Baba served as the centers of Bektashi tekkes (gathering places) before 1826. The türbe of Haji Bektash Veli is located in the original Bektashi tekke (now a museum) in the town that now bears his name and remains a site for Alevi pilgrims from throughout Turkey.

=== Bosnia and Herzegovina ===
At the peak of the Ottoman Empire, under Gazi Husrev-beg Sarajevo, Bosnia and Herzegovina, became one of the biggest and most important Ottoman cities in the Balkans after Istanbul, with the largest marketplace (modern day Baščaršija), and numerous mosques, which by the middle of the 16th century numbered more than 100. By 1660, the population of Sarajevo was estimated to be over 80,000. Husrev-beg greatly shaped the physical city, as most of what is now the Old Town was built during his reign. The Gazi Husrev-beg Mosque (Bosnian: Gazi Husrev-begova Džamija, Turkish: Gazi Hüsrev Bey Camii), is a mosque in Sarajevo historic marketplace Baščaršija, and it was built in 16th century. It is the largest historical mosque in Bosnia and Herzegovina and one of the most representative Ottoman structures in the Balkans. Gazi Husrev-beg's turbe is located in the mosque courtyard.

Travnik, in modern Bosnia and Herzegovina, became the capital of the Ottoman province of Bosnia and residence of the Bosnian viziers after 1699, when Sarajevo was set ablaze by Prince Eugene of Savoy. The Grand Viziers were sometimes buried in Travnik, and türbe shrines were erected in their honour in the heart of Old town of Travnik, where they stand today.

=== Hungary ===
The türbe of Idrisz Baba stands in Pécs, Hungary and was built in 1591. It features an octagonal base and domed sepulchre, with ogee-shaped lower windows and circular upper windows on the facade. It is one of only two surviving türbes of its kind in Hungary (the other is the Tomb of Gül Baba), and plays an important role in the record of Ottoman architecture in Hungary.

Not much is known about the Turkish person entombed in the türbe of Idrisz Baba; however, he was considered to be a holy man with the power to work miracles. It was later used as a storage facility for gunpowder. The türbe has been furnished with a mausoleum, embroidered sheet, and prayer mat by the Turkish government. Both the türbe of Idrisz Baba and the türbe of Gül Baba are places of pilgrimage for Muslims.

== See also ==
- Gonbad and Kümbet, Persian and Seljuk equivalents.
- Gongbei (Islamic architecture) (China)
- Turbah, a small piece of soil or clay, often a clay tablet, used during the Muslim prayer, and is recommended in particular by the Twelver Shia school of Islam.

== Bibliography ==
- Levey, Michael; The World of Ottoman Art, 1975, Thames & Hudson, ISBN 0500270651
- Lewis, Stephen (2001). "The Ottoman Architectural Patrimony in Bulgaria". EJOS. 30 (IV). Utrecht. ISSN 0928-6802.
- Meri, Josef F.; The cult of saints among Muslims and Jews in medieval Syria, Oxford Oriental monographs, Oxford University Press, 2002, ISBN 978-0199250783
