= Ali Tabrizi =

Persian woodcarver)

Ali Tabrizi (fl. late 14th/early 15th century; Persian: علی تبریزی) was an Iranian woodcarver who is credited with making the doors of the mausoleum of Ottoman sultan Mehmed I (r. 1413–1421) in Bursa, known as the Green Tomb (Turkish: Yeşil Türbe). Ali Tabrizi was the son of a certain Hajji Ahmad. He was amongst a number of Iranian craftsmen who had been invited by the main architect of the tomb, Hacı Ivaz Pasha, to come to Bursa in order to build the Complex of Mehmed I. He may have also carved the other doors and shutters found at the tomb complex, as well as the doors at the Bayezid Pasha mosque in Amasya. However, this remains uncertain.

== Sources ==
- Crane, H. (1985). "ʿALĪ TABRĪZĪ (woodcarver)". In Yarshater, Ehsan (ed.). Encyclopædia Iranica. Vol. I/8: Alafrank–Alp Arslan. London and New York: Routledge & Kegan Paul. p. 881. ISBN 978-0-71009-097-3.
- Gierlichs, Joachim (2013). "Tabrizi Woodcarvings in Timurid Iran". In Pfeiffer, Judith (ed.). Politics, Patronage and the Transmission of Knowledge in 13th - 15th Century Tabriz. BRILL. pp. 357, 396. ISBN 978-9004262577.
- Stierlin, Henri (1998). Turkey: From the Selcuks to the Ottomans. Taschen. p. 86. ISBN 978-3822877678.
