= Ferhadija =

Ferhadija may refer to:

- Ferhat Pasha Mosque (Banja Luka) or Ferhadija Mosque, a central building in Banja Luka, Bosnia and Herzegovina
- Ferhadija Mosque (Sarajevo), a mosque in Sarajevo, Bosnia and Herzegovina
- Ferhadija street, a street in Sarajevo
