= Ferhat Pasha Mosque =

Ferhat Pasha Mosque, also known as Ferhadija Mosque, may refer to:

== Bosnia and Herzegovina ==
- Ferhat Pasha Mosque (Banja Luka)
- Ferhat Pasha Mosque (Sarajevo)
