= Sarajevo bread line massacre =

Shelling of civilians during the Bosnian War

- Part of the Siege of Sarajevo
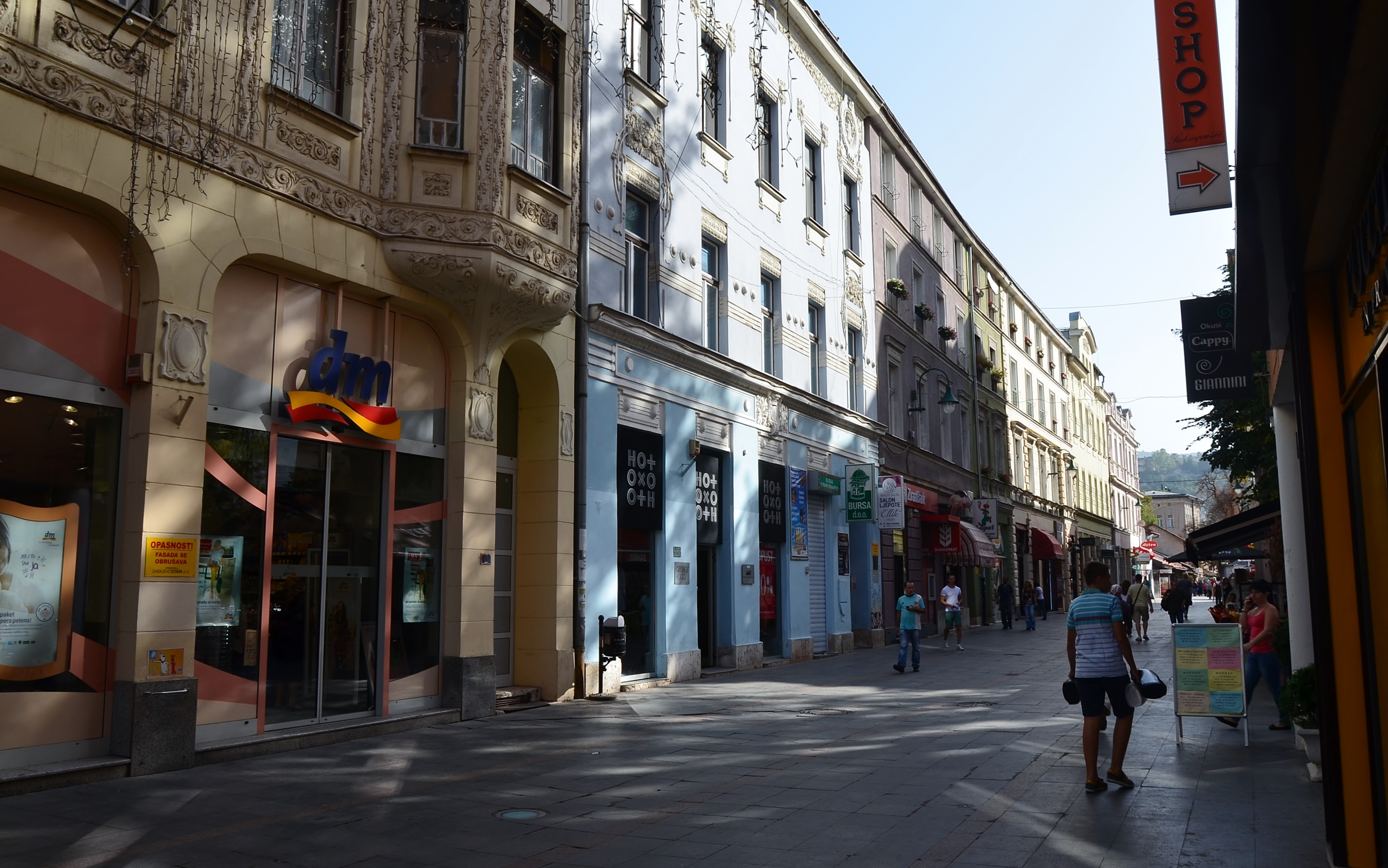
- The site of the massacre pictured in 2015
- Location: 43°51′32.44″N 18°25′31.89″E; Sarajevo, Bosnia and Herzegovina
- Date: 27 May 1992
- Target: Sarajevo civilians
- Attack type: Artillery attack
- Deaths: 26
- Injuries: 108
- Perpetrator: Army of Republika Srpska (denied by Bosnian Serbs)
- Motive: Alleged false flag (Bosnian Serb claim)

The Sarajevo bread line massacre refers to the artillery attack on Sarajevo on 27 May 1992, suspected to have been carried out by the Army of Republika Srpska. Three grenades were fired from the position in the direction of Borije, which exploded among civilians who were waiting in line for bread on Sarajevo's main street Vaso Miskin street (today's Ferhadija street). 26 citizens of Sarajevo were killed and 108 were wounded.

The massacre was filmed and the scenes of murdered, wounded and maimed Sarajevans traveled the world and significantly contributed to the public at large sympathizing with the Republic of Bosnia and Herzegovina, and against the Bosnian Serbs who were heavily criticized by the Western press on that occasion.

On 30 May 1992, the massacre was given as a reason for the United Nations Security Council passing the Security Council Resolution 757 which banned all international trade, scientific and technical cooperation, sports and cultural exchanges, air travel, and travel of government officials from the Federal Republic of Yugoslavia.

== Claims of the Serbian side ==
The Serbian side denied responsibility for the war crime, attributing it to the Army of the Republic of Bosnia and Herzegovina and interpreting it as a false flag operation, claiming that mortar shells were fired from positions that at the time of the event were held by forces loyal to the Bosnian government in Sarajevo.

== Prosecutor's Office in The Hague ==
The Ferhadija attack was not listed as one of the indictments that Ratko Mladić charged with, but was still referred to during his trial, as an example of artillery terror being used against Sarajevan civilians during the Bosnian Serb siege.

The Mladić defence witness, Zorica Subotić, a defence ballistics expert from Belgrade, argued that Bosnian Serb forces were not responsible for several deadly artillery attacks against civilians, including both the Ferhadija attack and the Markale massacres, and attributed blame to Bosniak forces.

In the Ferhadija case, Subotić claimed that there were several inconsistencies, including incorrect police reports taken after the incident, and claimed that, according to her findings, the shells has been fired from Bosnian Army positions between 100 and 120 meters away.

The tribunal however did not conduct any further investigation into the massacre.

== Gallery ==
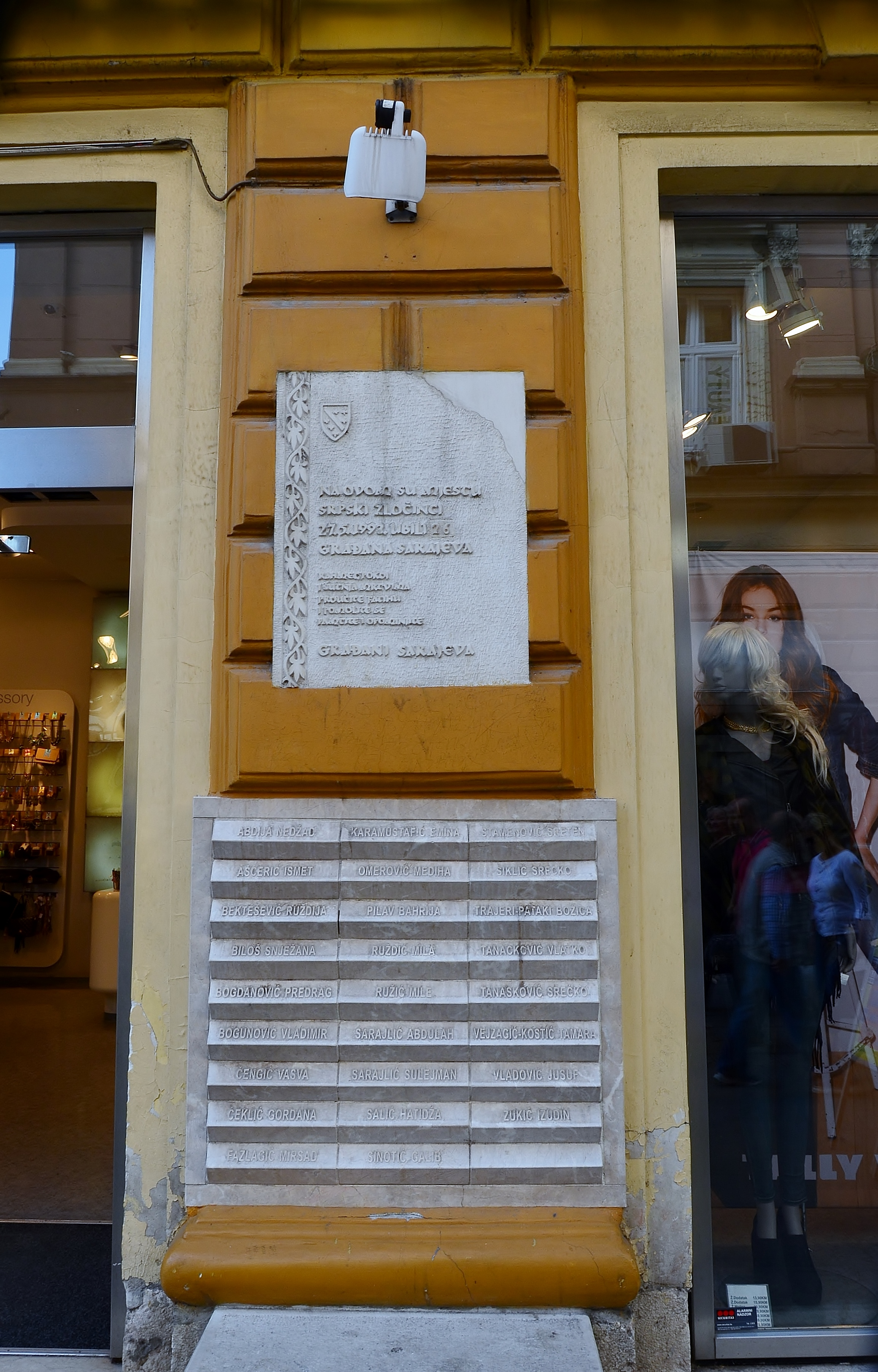
A memorial plaque on the site of the massacre

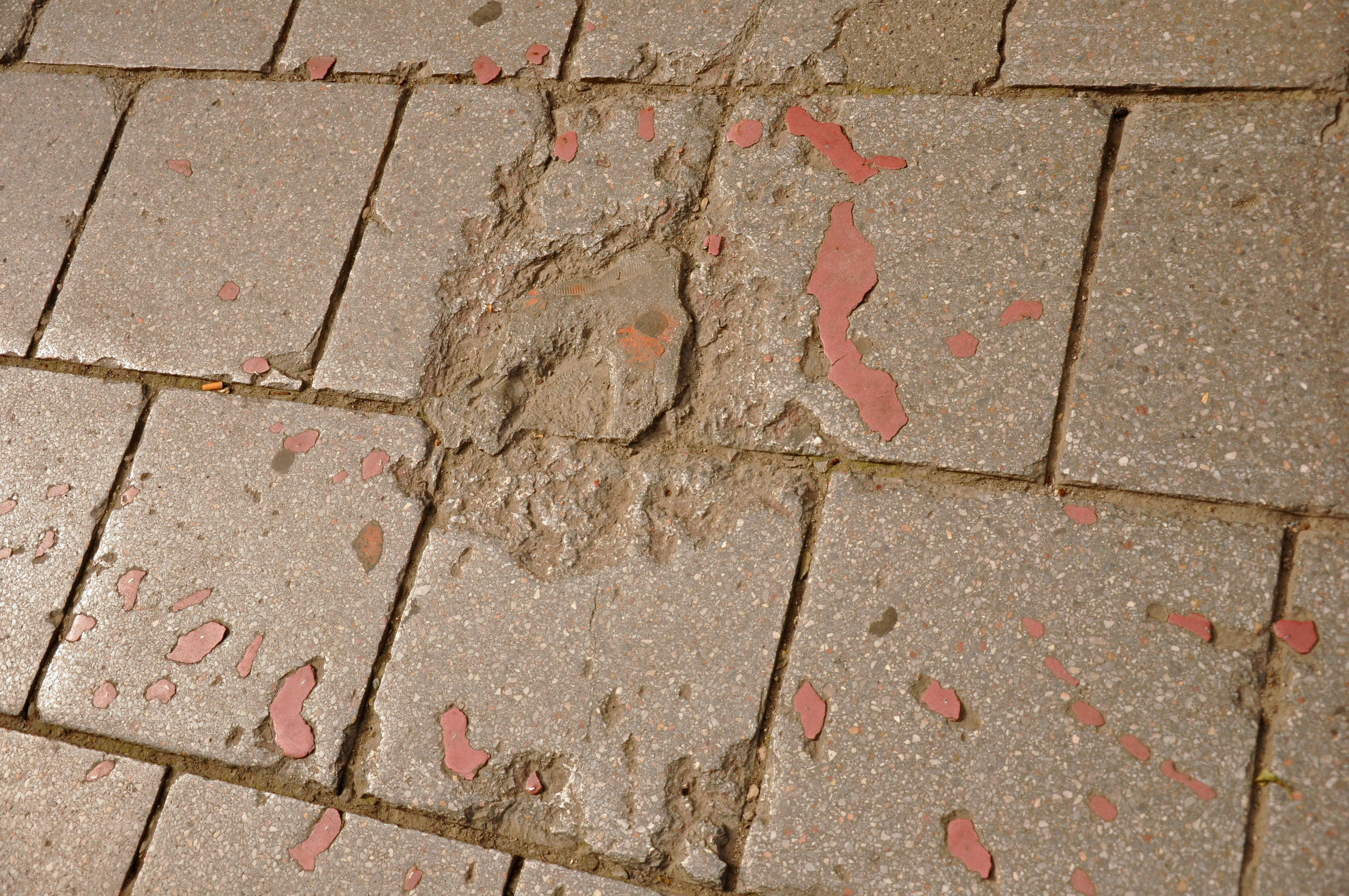
A Sarajevo Rose, a concrete scar caused by a mortar shell's explosion that was later filled with red resin

== See also ==
- List of massacres in the Bosnian War

== Notes ==
1. The massacre is also referred to as the Vaso Miskin street massacre or the Ferhadija street massacre.
