= Sarači street =

Street in Sarajevo, Bosnia and Herzegovina

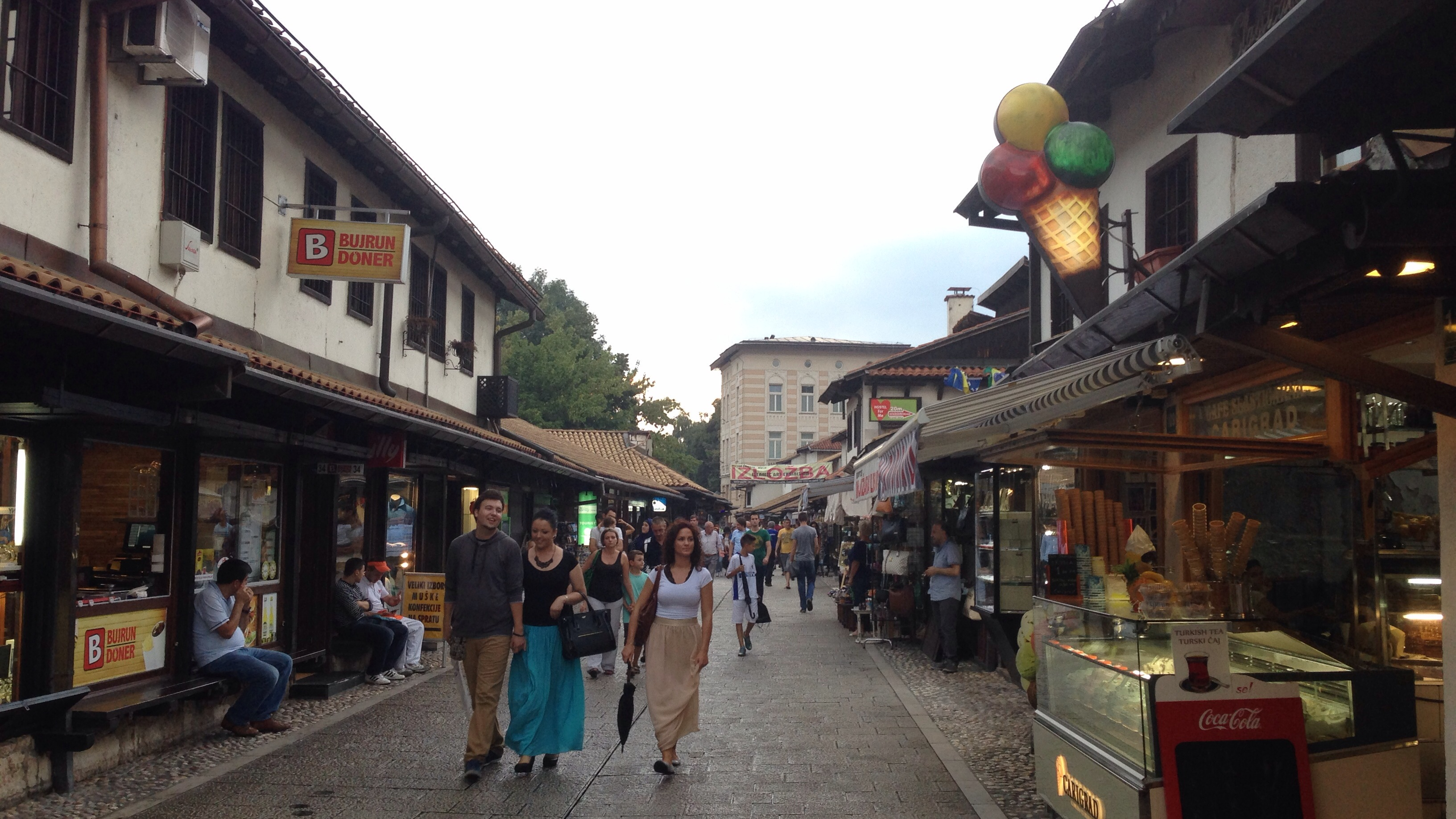
- Interactive map of Sarači street
- Native name: Ulica Sarači (Bosnian)
- Former name: Petar II Karađorđević street
- Length: 0.22 km (0.14 mi)
- Location: Baščaršija
- Coordinates: 43°51′34.09″N 18°25′46.41″E
- East: Baščaršija (main square)
- West: Ferhadija street

Sarači street is one of main pedestrian streets in Sarajevo, located in Baščaršija, Stari Grad Municipality. Sarači street is named after Saraç, a Turkish word for craftsmen who are making saddles.

Sarači street is connecting Ferhadija street on west and main square on Baščaršija on east, and entire street is pedestrian zone. Numerous shops with traditional handicraft products are located in this street. It can be noticed that the passage from Sarači street into Ferhadija street is a line that separating or connecting the characteristics of the eastern and western culture inherited during the rich history, as well as the entire City of Sarajevo.

Sarači street is located within "Historical City Area - Sarajevo Čaršija", which is declared in 2014 as National Monument of Bosnia and Herzegovina.

== History of name ==
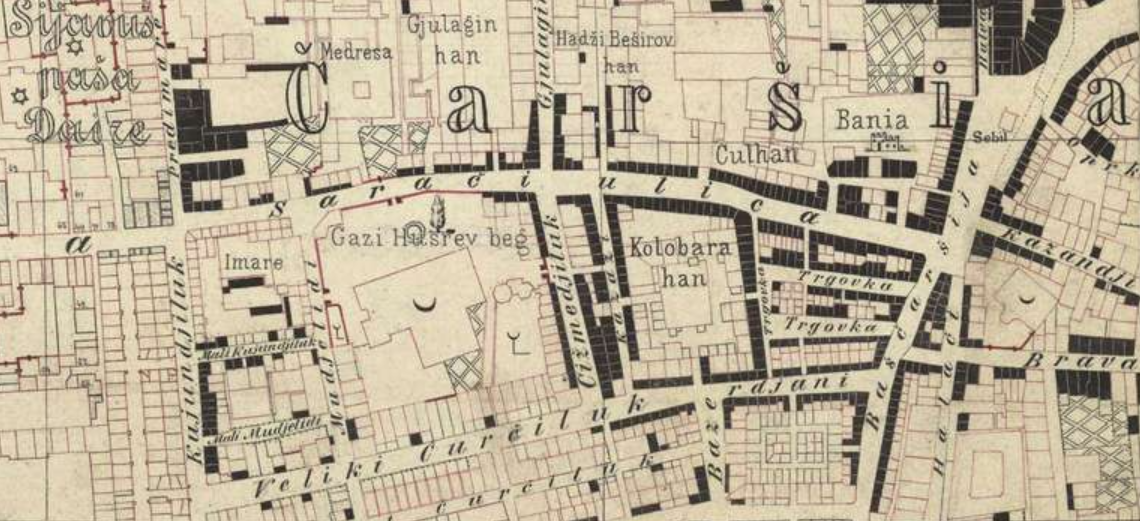
Sarači in 1882

This road existed as early as 1462, about which there is a trace in the vakufnama of Isa-Beg Ishaković from that year, in which this street is mentioned as a road. From 1928 to 1941, when it was connected with Ferhadija street, it was named after Prince and later King Peter II Karadjordjevic, and in 1941, old name has been restored.

Together with Bazardžani street and Kazazi Street, Sarači street is one of the first streets that were named in Sarajevo.

== Events ==
On April 6, 2018, day of re-opening of the Sarajevo cable car, City Administration of Sarajevo organized exhibition of historical photos from family albums on which Sarajevo cable car is visible, named "Memories", and photos were exhibit in windows of all stores in Sarači street.

== Significant buildings ==
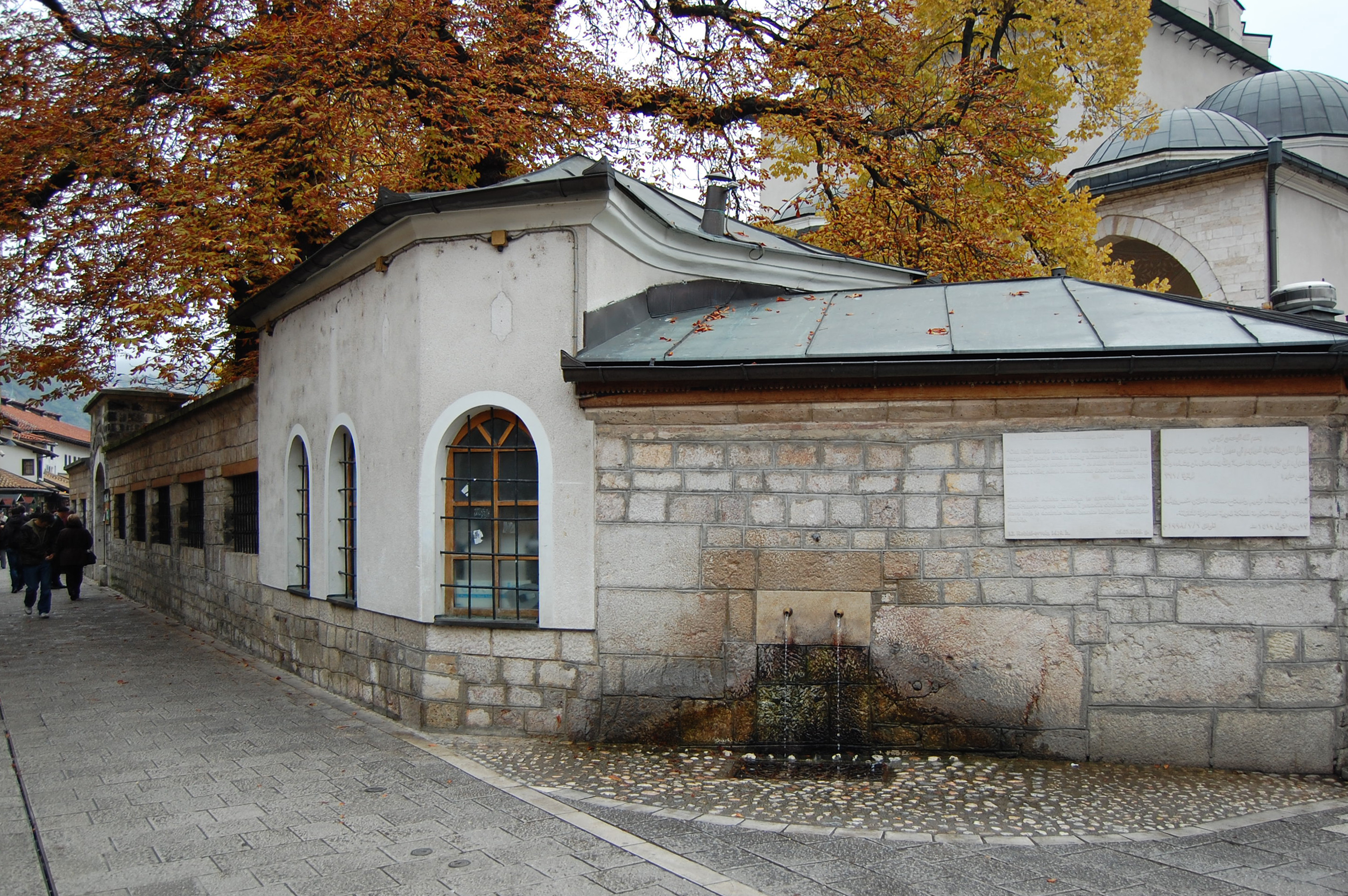
Drinking fountain and wall of Gazi Husrev-beg Mosque

Several significant buildings and institutions are located in this street and some of them are:

- Morića Han
- Gazi Husrev-beg Mosque
- Gazi Husrev-beg's Museum (including Kuršumli mederesa)
