= Ferhadija street =

Street in Sarajevo, Bosnia and Herzegovina

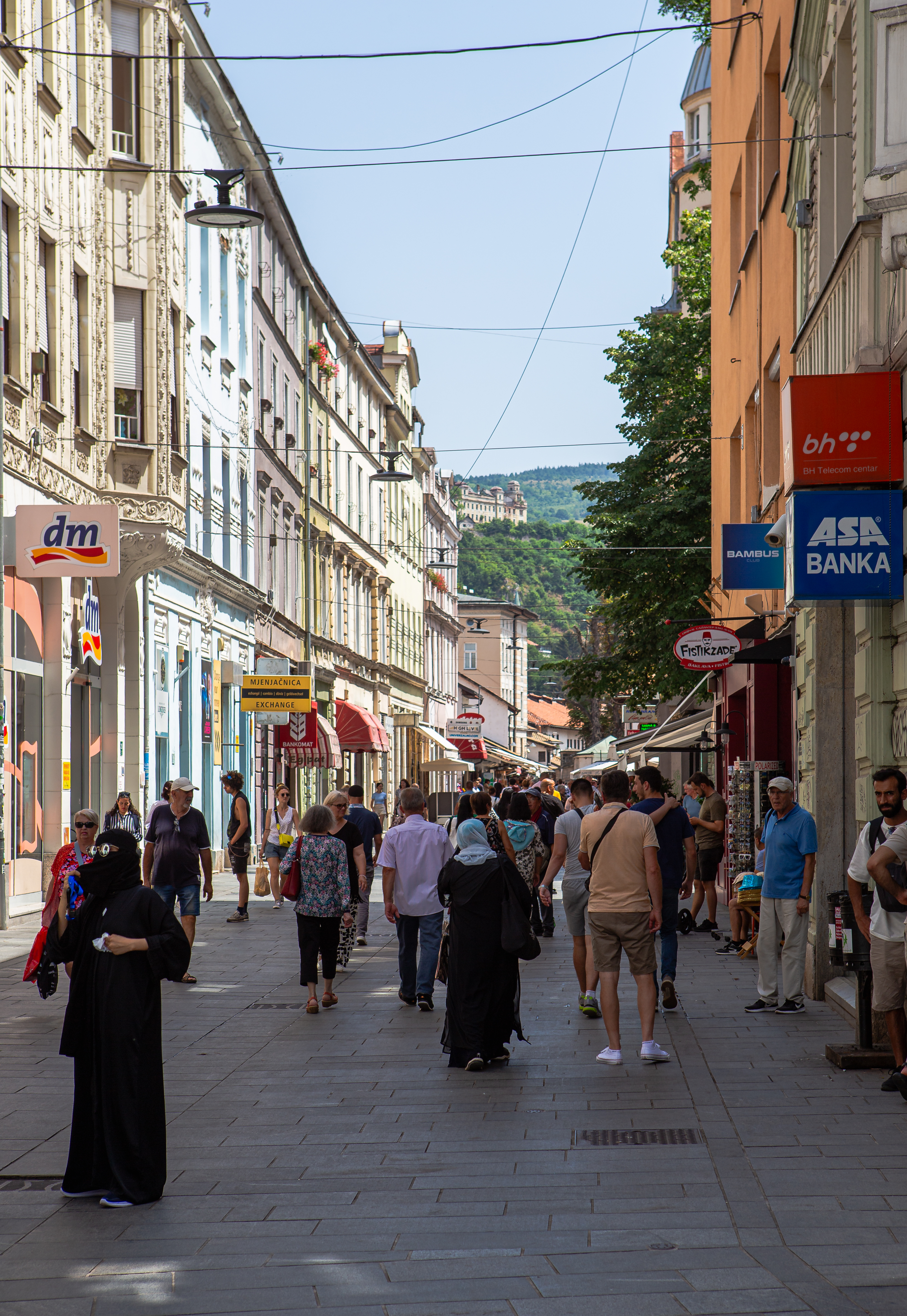
- Ferhadija street in 2023

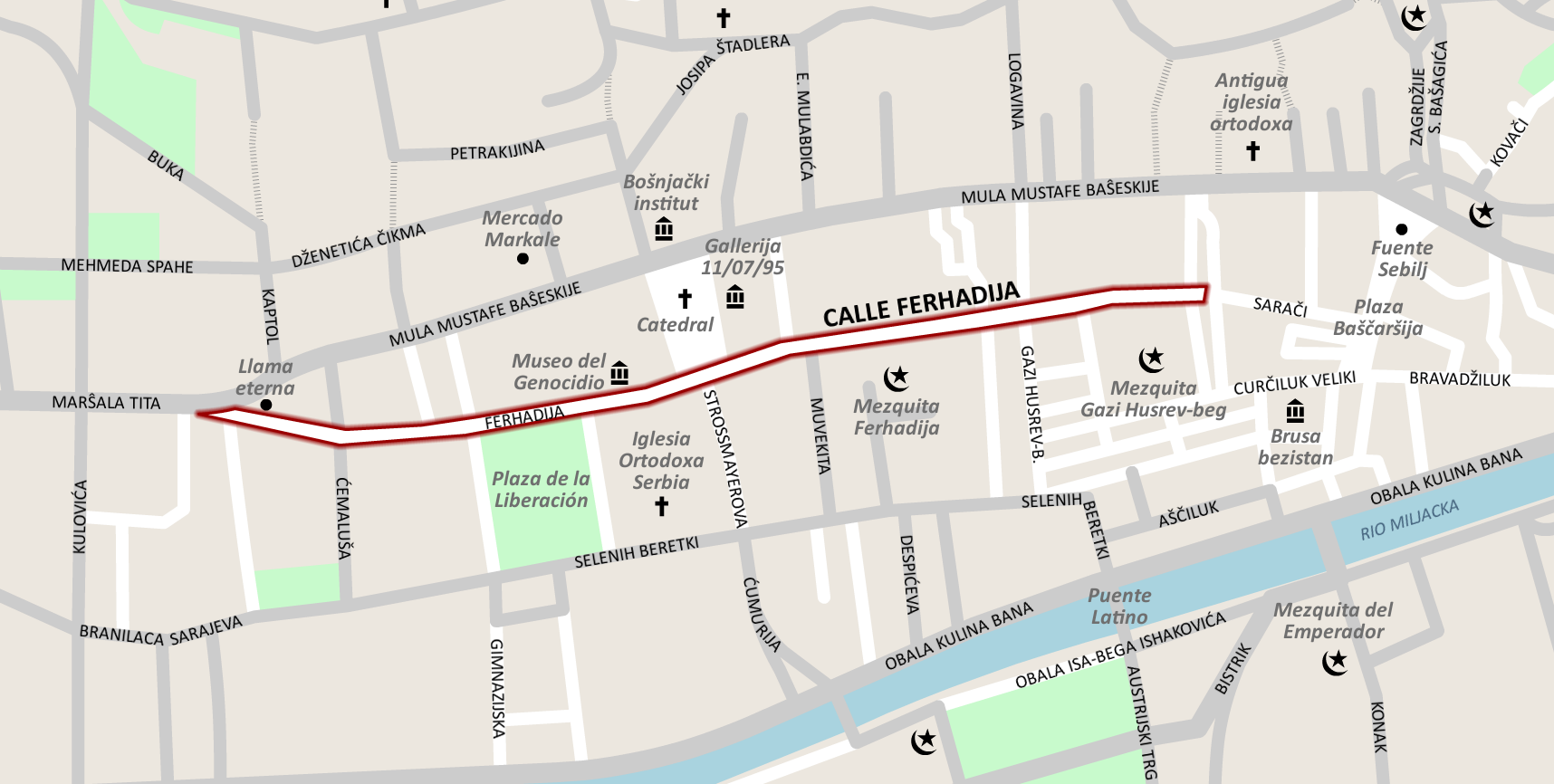
- Native name: Ulica Ferhadija (Bosnian)
- Former names: Petar II Karađorđević street, Vaso Miskin street
- Length: 0.52 km (0.32 mi)
- Coordinates: 43°51′32.44″N 18°25′31.89″E
- East: Sarači street
- West: Marshal Tito street

Ferhadija street is one of main pedestrian streets in Sarajevo, located in the municipalities of Centar and Stari Grad. The street is named after Ferhad-bey Vuković-Desisalić, a Bosnian sanjak-bey who lived in the 16th century.

Ferhadija street connects to Sarači street on its east side and Marshal Tito street on its west side, and the entire street is a pedestrian zone.

== History of name ==
Until 1928, the street was named Ferhadija, after Ferhad-bey Vuković-Desisalić, who in 1561/62 built a mosque in that street. From 1928 to 1941, when it was connected with Sarači, it was named after Prince and later King Peter II Karadjordjevic. From 1941 to 1945, street returned the old name Ferhadija, and from 1945 to 1993, her name was named after Vaso Miskin Crni, national hero of Yugoslavia. Since 1993, old name has been restored.

== Significant buildings ==
Several significant buildings and institutions are located in this street and some of them are:

- Eternal flame
- Sarajevo Markethall
- School of Economics and Business Sarajevo
- Sacred Heart Cathedral
- Ferhadija Mosque
- Norwegian Embassy
- Swedish Embassy

== See also ==
- Ferhadija street massacre
