= Morića Han =

Caravanserai in Sarajevo, Bosnia and Herzegovina

Coordinates: 43.8597°N 18.4301°E

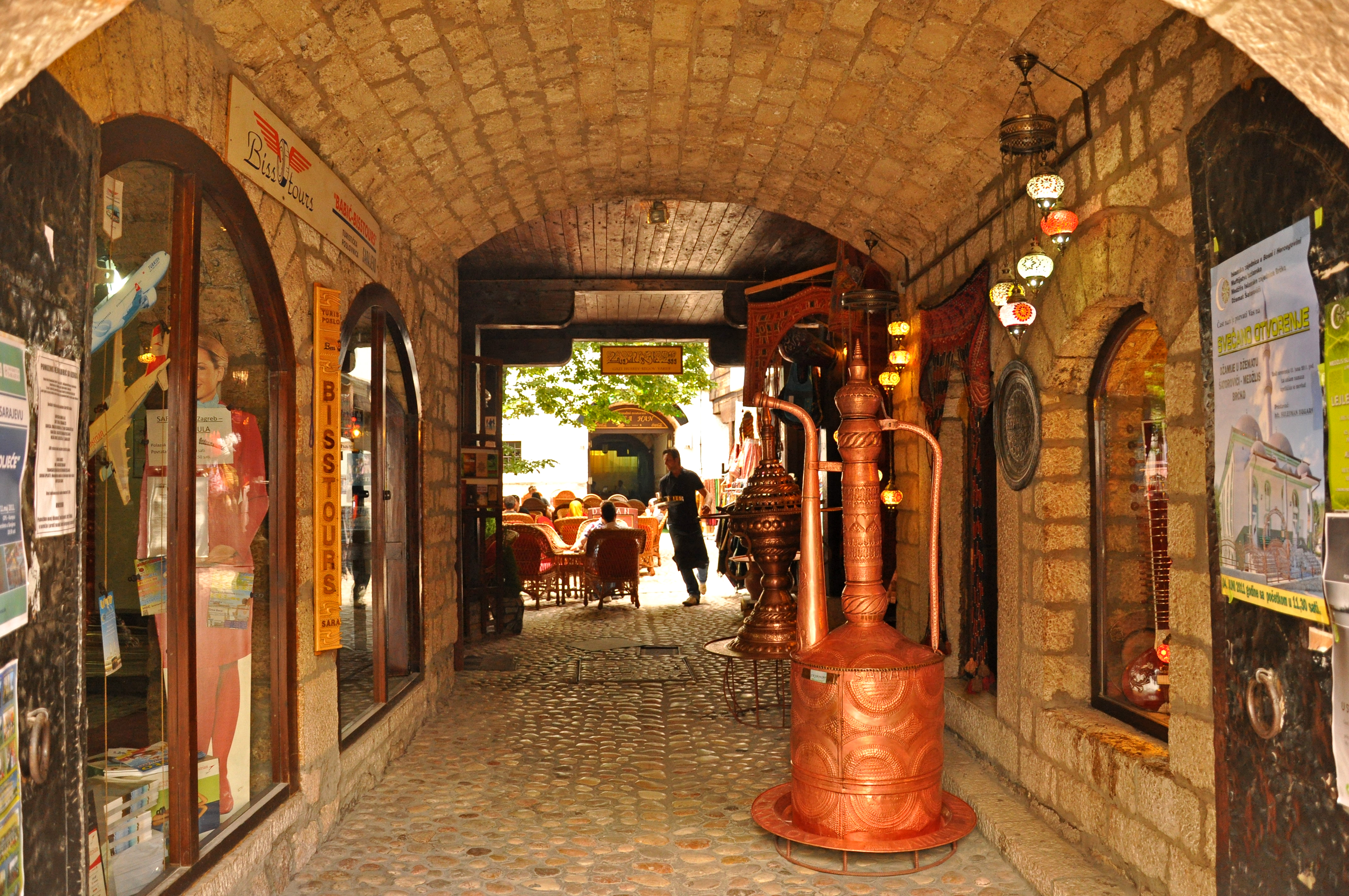
Morića Han's entrance

Morića Han is a han (a roadside inn) originally built in 1551 in Sarajevo, Ottoman Empire (now Bosnia and Herzegovina). After a fire in 1697 it was reconstructed in its current form. Morića Han is one of the buildings which were financed by and belonged to Gazi Husrev-Beg's endowment (Vakuf). It is the only surviving han in Sarajevo. It is located in Baščaršija, Sarači street, in Stari Grad.

Morića Han (also spelled "khan" when translated to English) is considered a true caravanserai because, when operational, it could accommodate about 300 passengers and 70 horses. Evliya Çelebi, an Ottoman traveller, wrote about his visit to Sarajevo in 1659 and described Morića Han as Hadži-Bešir's han, because Hadži-Bešir was landlord of the han then. The modern name probably comes from the surname of the han's tenants at the beginning of the 19th century, Mustafa-aga Morić and his son Ibrahim-aga Morić. However, some sources connect the name of this han with the Morić brothers who participated in rebellions against the Ottoman Empire from 1747 to 1757.

The citizens of Sarajevo gathered in Morića Han on 29 July 1878, established Narodni Odbor (English: Peoples Council) and protested against the occupation of Bosnia and Herzegovina by Austria-Hungary.

The han has experienced several fires, most recently in December 1957 when the entire building was destroyed. It was reconstructed from 1971 to 1974 and decorated with Persian calligraphy inscriptions from poems written by Omar Khayyám. Stari Grad returned ownership of Morića Han to Gazi Husrev-Beg's endowment in 1998. Management of the endowment rents the han for business purposes that match the historical context, including a national restaurant, a Persian carpet shop, and religious societies.

Morića Han is mentioned in the sevdalinka song "Vila kliče sa vrh Trebevića" used in the film When Father Was Away on Business, directed by Emir Kusturica.

== Gallery ==
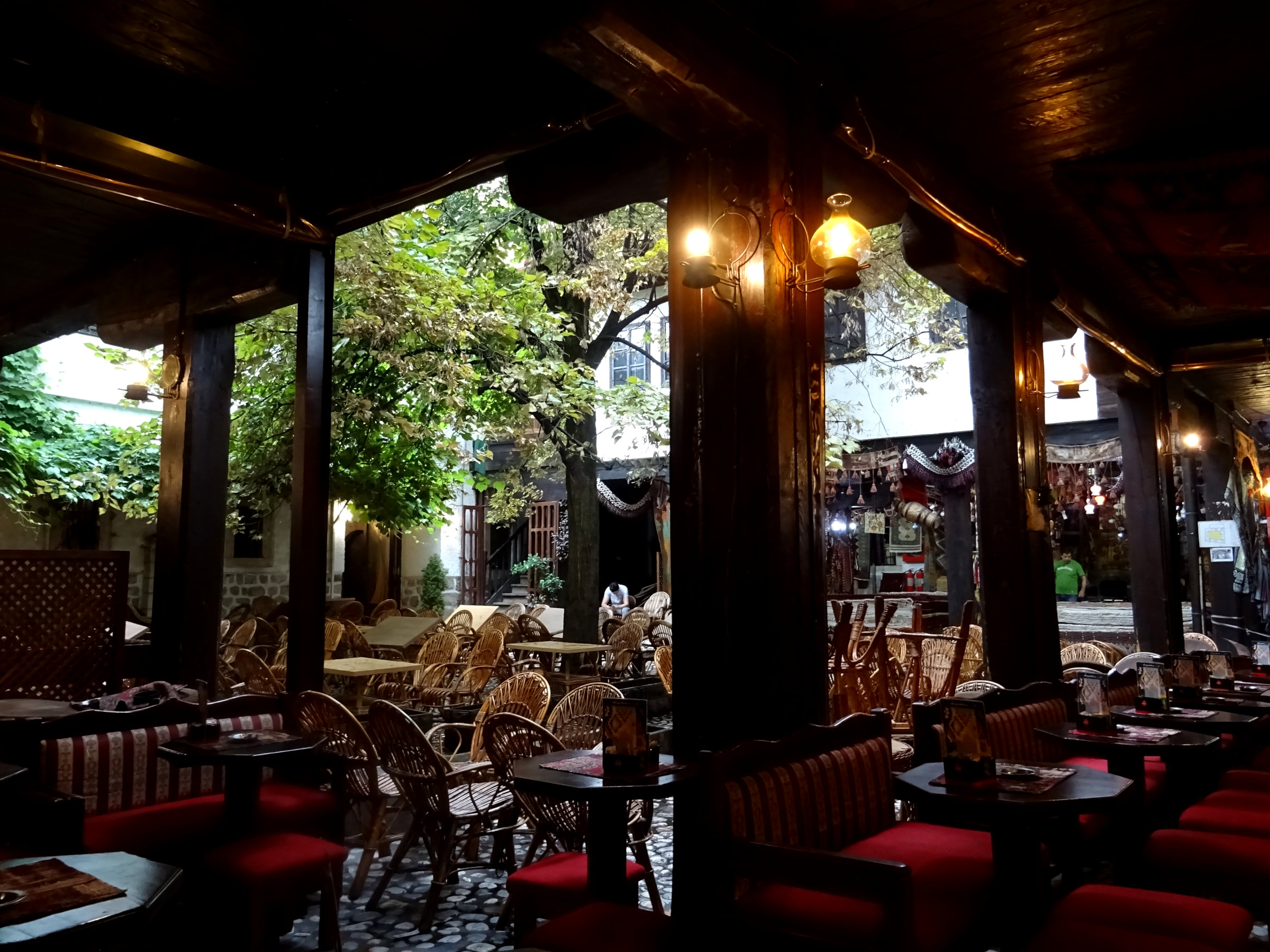
Morića Han courtyard

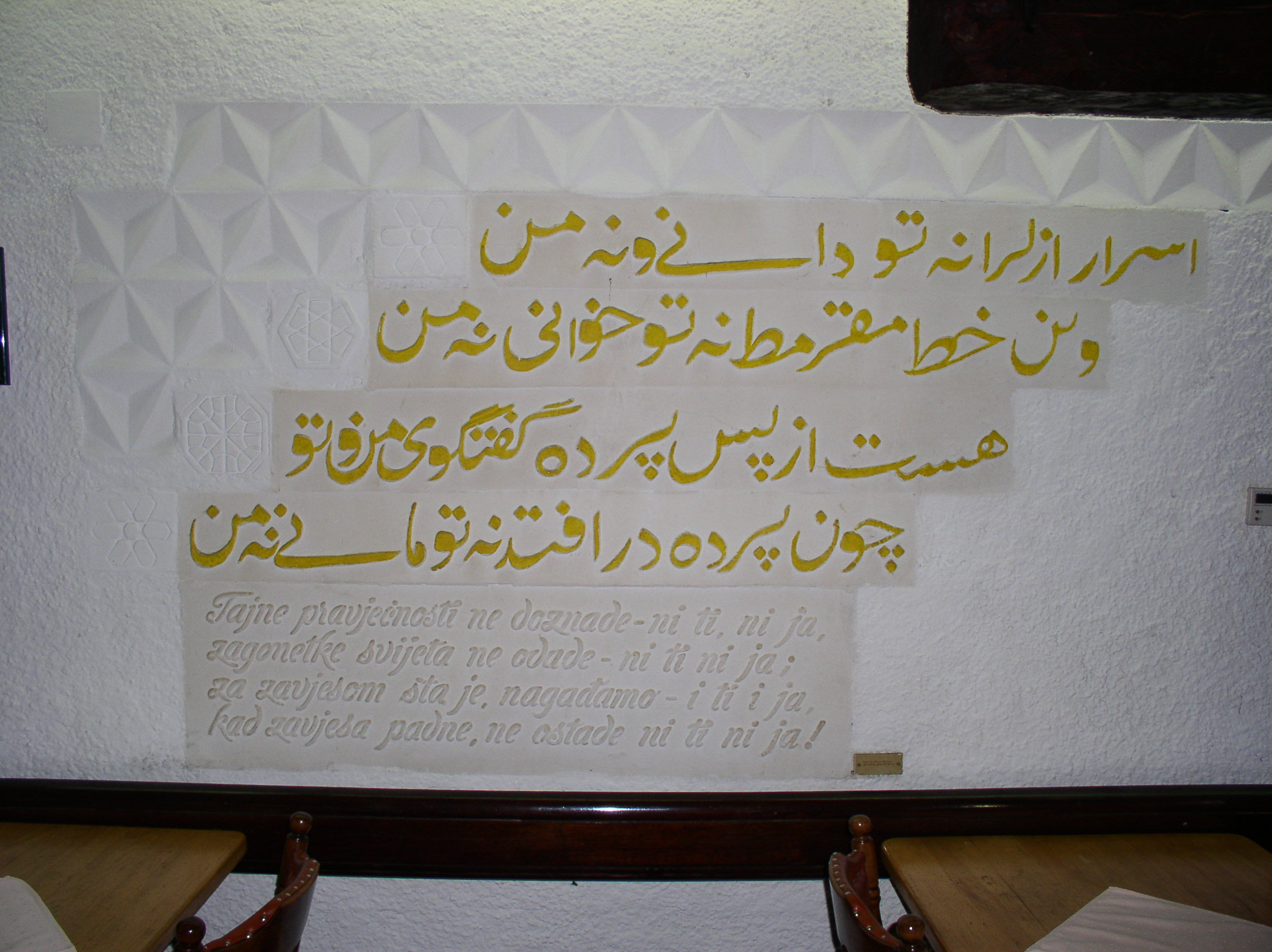
Inscription from poem written by Omar Khayyám

== See also ==
- Stari Grad, Sarajevo
- Caravanserai
- Baščaršija
