= Baščaršija =

Neighbourhood in Bosnia and Herzegovina

Baščaršija Башчаршија
- Neighbourhood
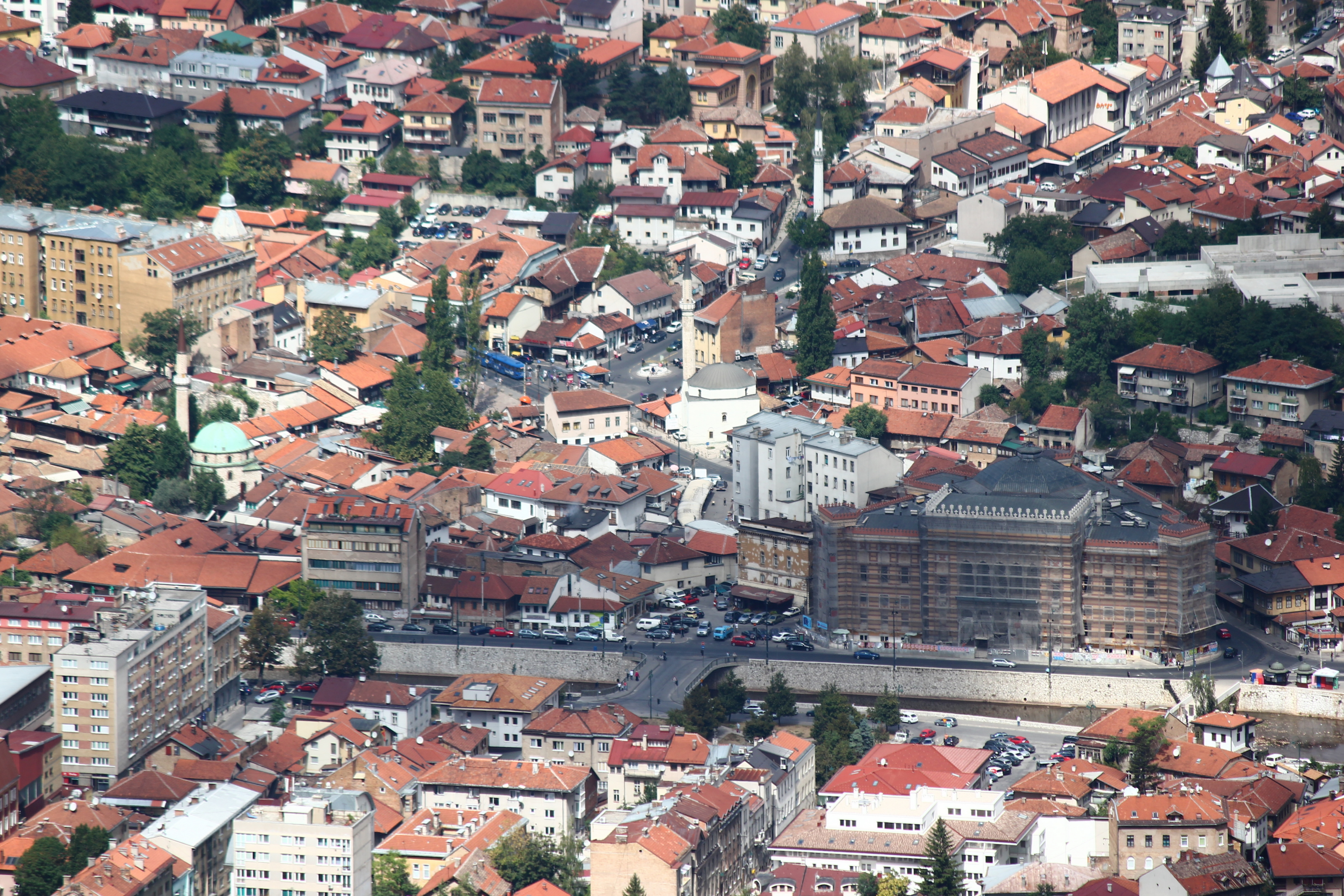
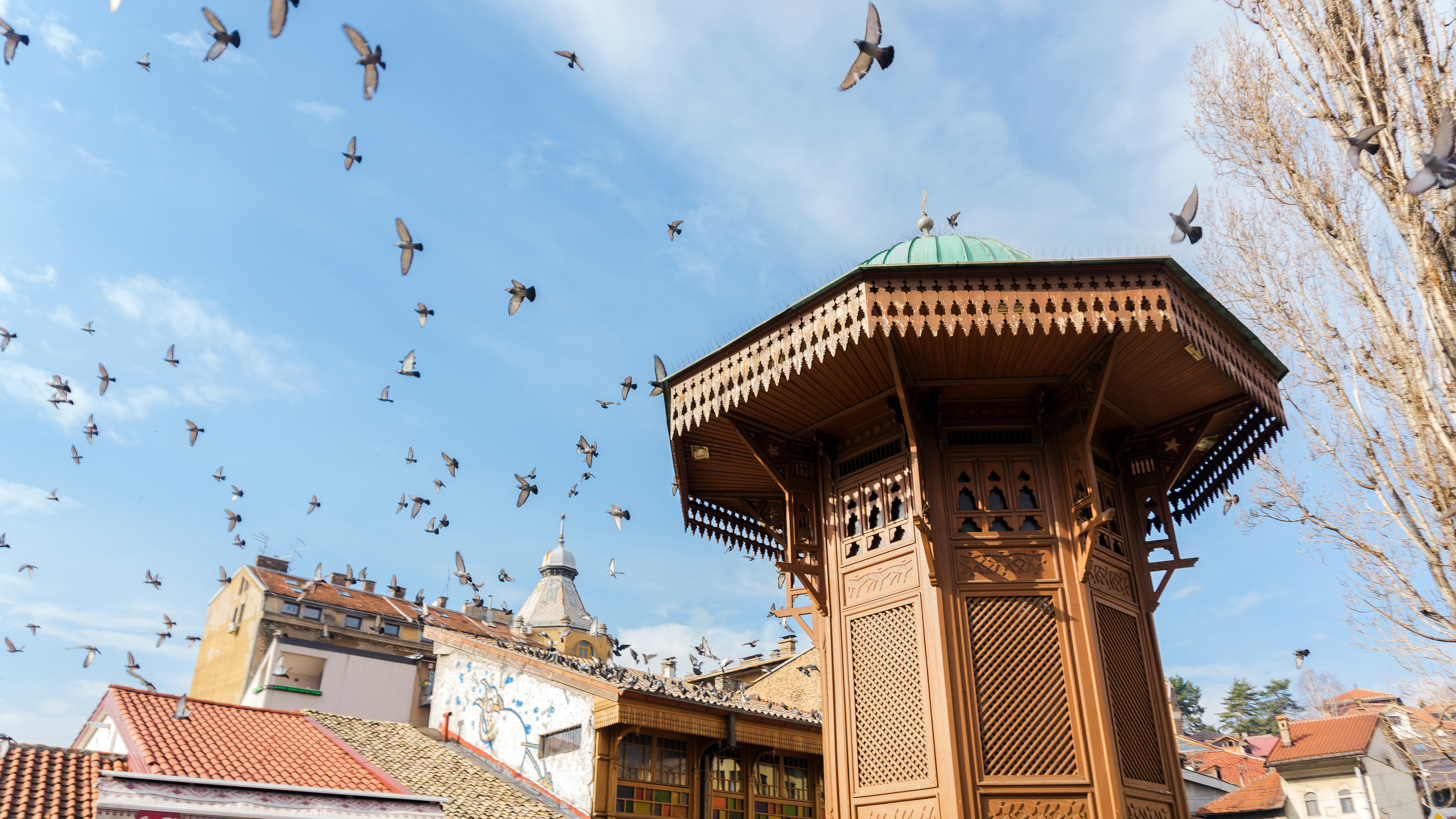
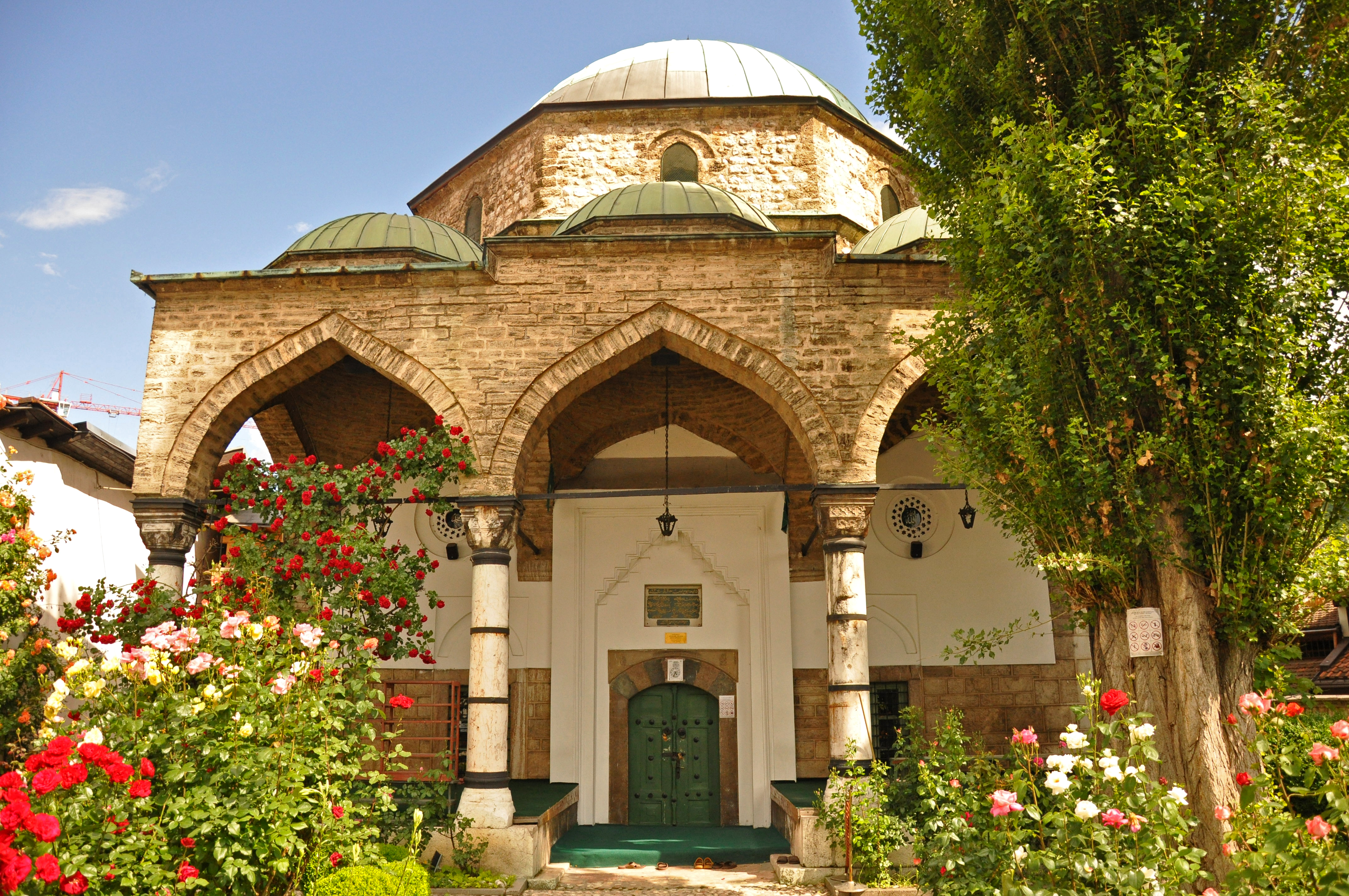
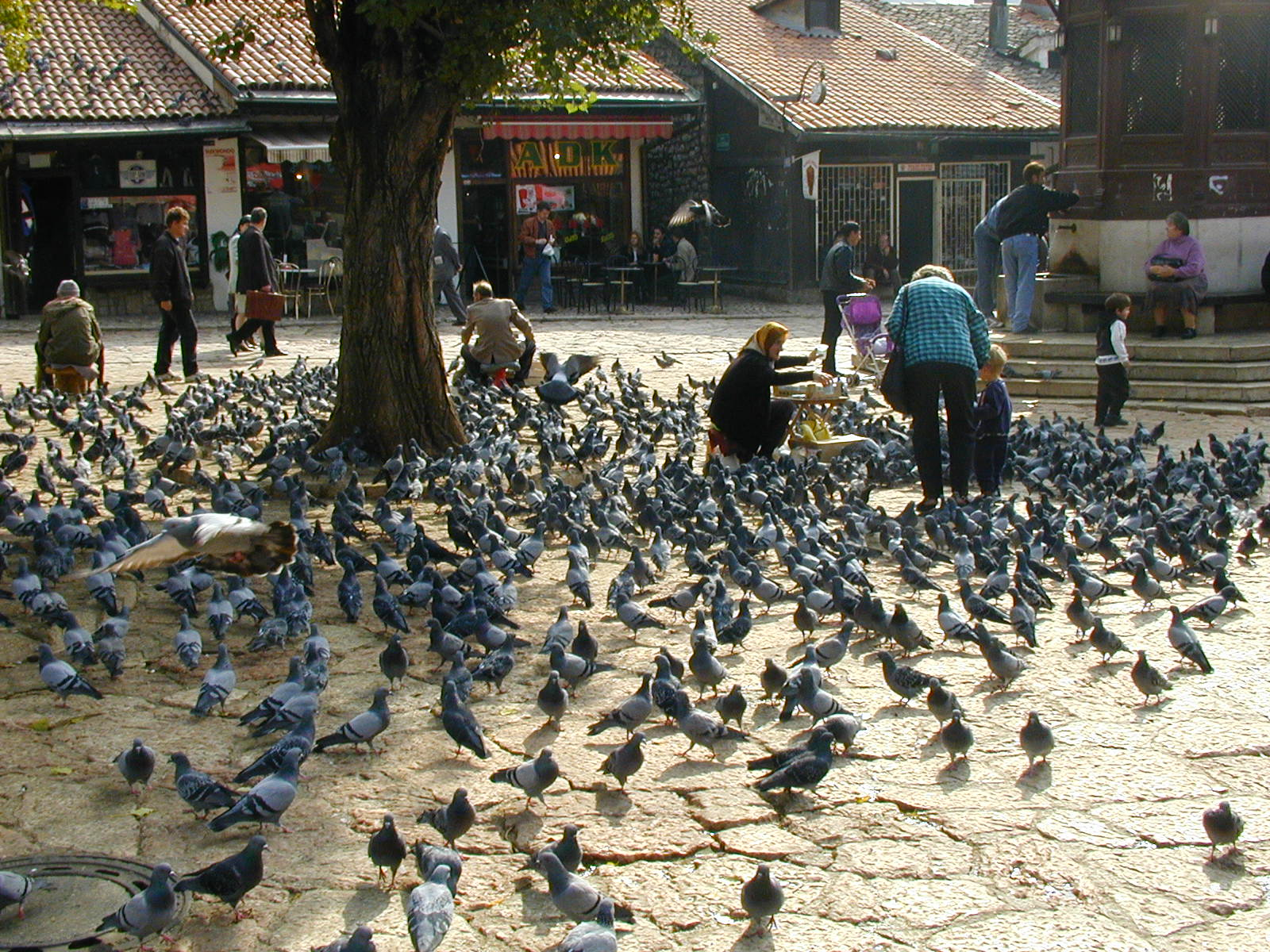
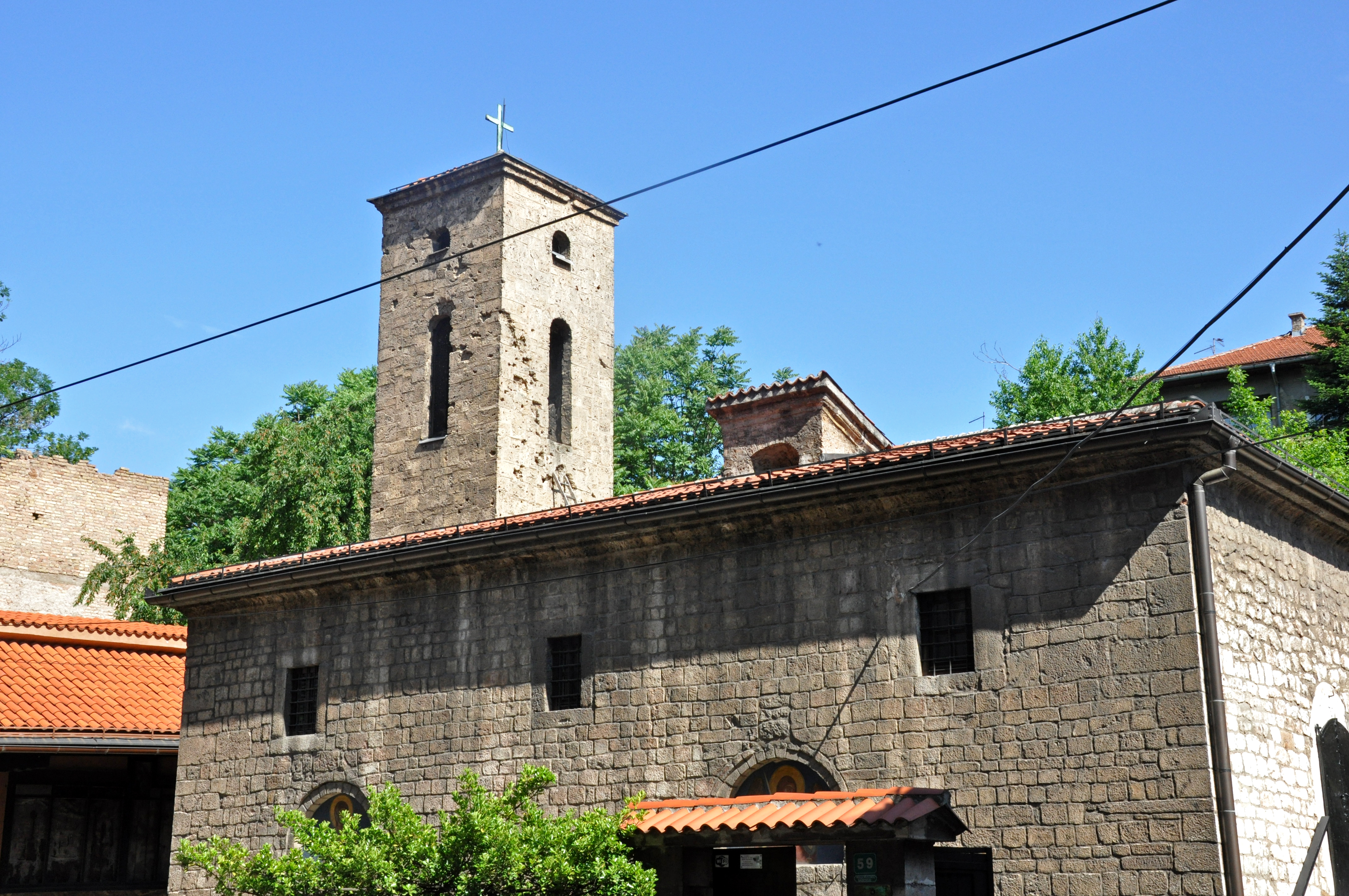
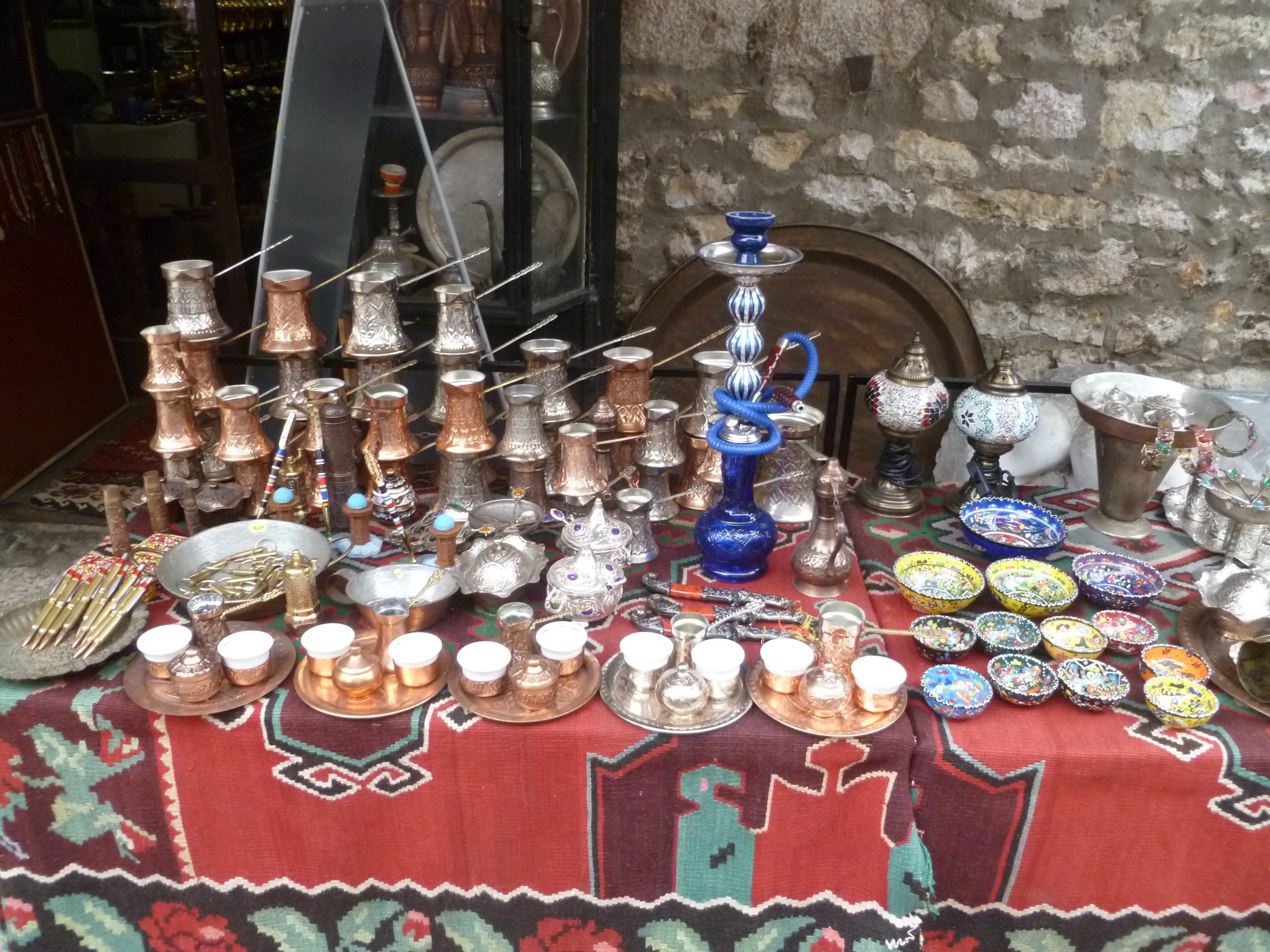
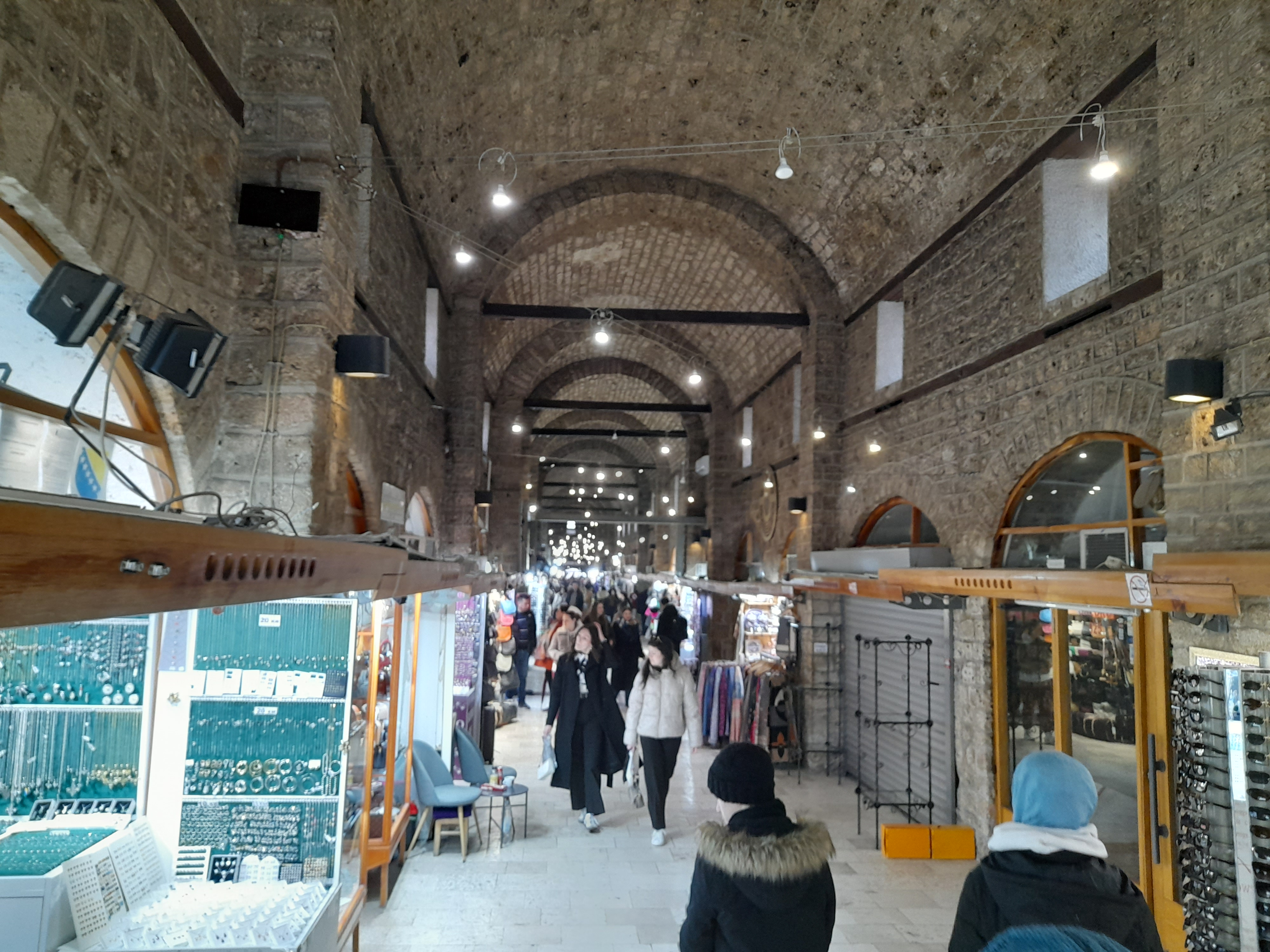

- Location within Bosnia and Herzegovina
- Coordinates: 43.859°N 18.430°E
- Country: Bosnia and Herzegovina
- Entity: Federation of Bosnia and Herzegovina
- Canton: Sarajevo Canton
- City: Sarajevo
- Municipality: Stari Grad, Sarajevo

Government
  - President of the local community council: Mirsad Hašimbegović
- Time zone: UTC+1 (CET)
  - Summer (DST): UTC+2 (CEST)
- Area code: +387

Baščaršija (Cyrillic: Башчаршија; pronounced [baʃ.tʃǎr.ʃi.ja]) is Sarajevo's old bazaar and the historical and cultural center of the city. It is also a local community within the Stari Grad municipality. Baščaršija was built in the 15th century when Isa-beg Ishaković founded the city.

Baščaršija is located on the north bank of the river Miljacka, in the municipality of Stari Grad. On Baščaršija there are several important historic buildings, such as the Gazi Husrev-beg Mosque and sahat-kula. Today Baščaršija is the major tourist attraction of Sarajevo.

== Etymology ==
The word Baščaršija derives from the Turkish language. The word "baš" which is "baş" in Turkish literally means "head", but in some contexts also means "primary", "main", "capital". "Čaršija" which is "çarşı" in Turkish means "bazaar" or "market".

Although the suffix "ja" (modern Turkish: "(y)a") means "to" in Turkish, implying that the full name of the district literally translates to "to the main bazaar", it is more likely that the ending -ija is a Bosnianism, as many Turkish loanwords have the same ending to conform to Bosnian grammatical rules. In the nominative case, the place has always been referred to in Turkish as "Başçarşı" only, without "ya".

== History ==
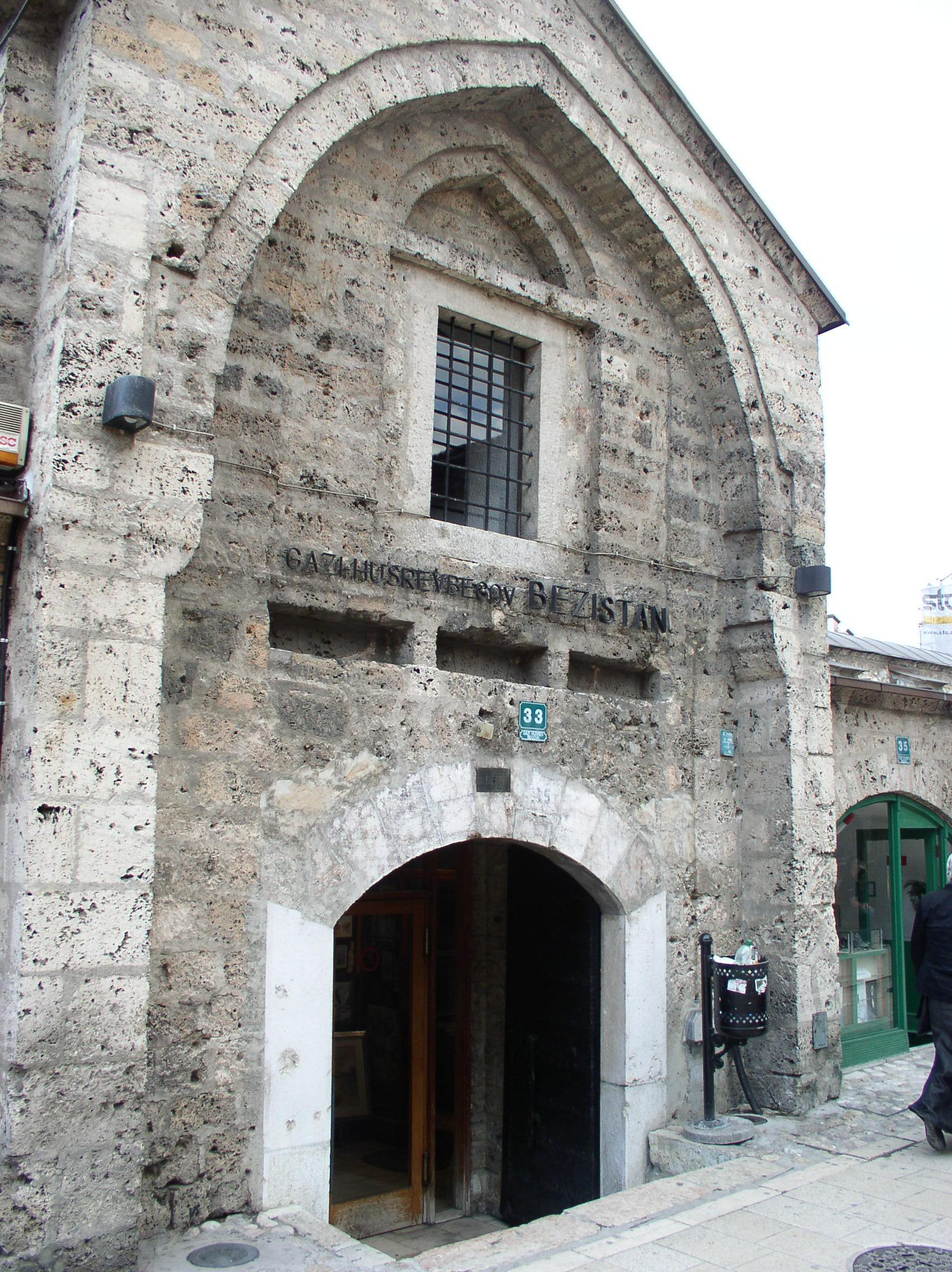
One of the entrances to Gazi Husrev-beg's Bezistan

Before the arrival of the Ottomans in the largest settlement on Sarajevo field was the village square Tornik, which was located at the crossroad of the roads where today is the Ali Pasha's Mosque. Baščaršija was built in 1462 when Isa-Beg Isaković built the Ishaković han, in addition to its many shops.

Around the main entrance, the Bazerdžani čaršija was formed. The čaršija Kazaz is situated to the west, and to the north sit both the čaršija Sedlar and Sarača. The most significant buildings constructed during this period were mosques. Baščaršija's famous mosque was built by Havedža Durak in 1528, and Gazi Husrev-beg built his mosque in 1530.

Gazi Husrev-beg built a Gazi Husrev-begova Medresa, a library, a haniqah, the Gazi Husrev-beg Hamam, the Gazi Husrev-beg bezistan, the Morića Han, sahat-kula and other tourist attractions in Baščaršija. Gazi Husrev-Beg was buried in the harem of his mosque, beside the harem is the türbe of his freed slave and the first mutevelija of his vakuf, Murat-beg Tardić.

Along with Islamic places of worship erected at that time, Baščaršija is also the location of the Old Orthodox Church, built sometime during the 16th century and first mentioned in Ottoman sources from 1539, and also the first Sephardic Jewish temple the Old Synagogue, built between 1581 and 1587. Just next to the Old Synagogue (Bosnian: Stari Hram = Old Temple) the New Synagogue (Bosnian: Novi Hram = New Temple) was built a short time after.

Today the Jewish community uses the more recently erected synagogue just across the Miljacka river, while both Old and New synagogue buildings are used as Jewish cultural centers. The New Synagogue was donated by the Jewish community to the city of Sarajevo and serves as a gallery called Novi Hram. The Old Synagogue building was turned into the Jewish Museum of Bosnia and Herzegovina, and is considered to be one of the finest exhibition spaces in the former Yugoslavia.

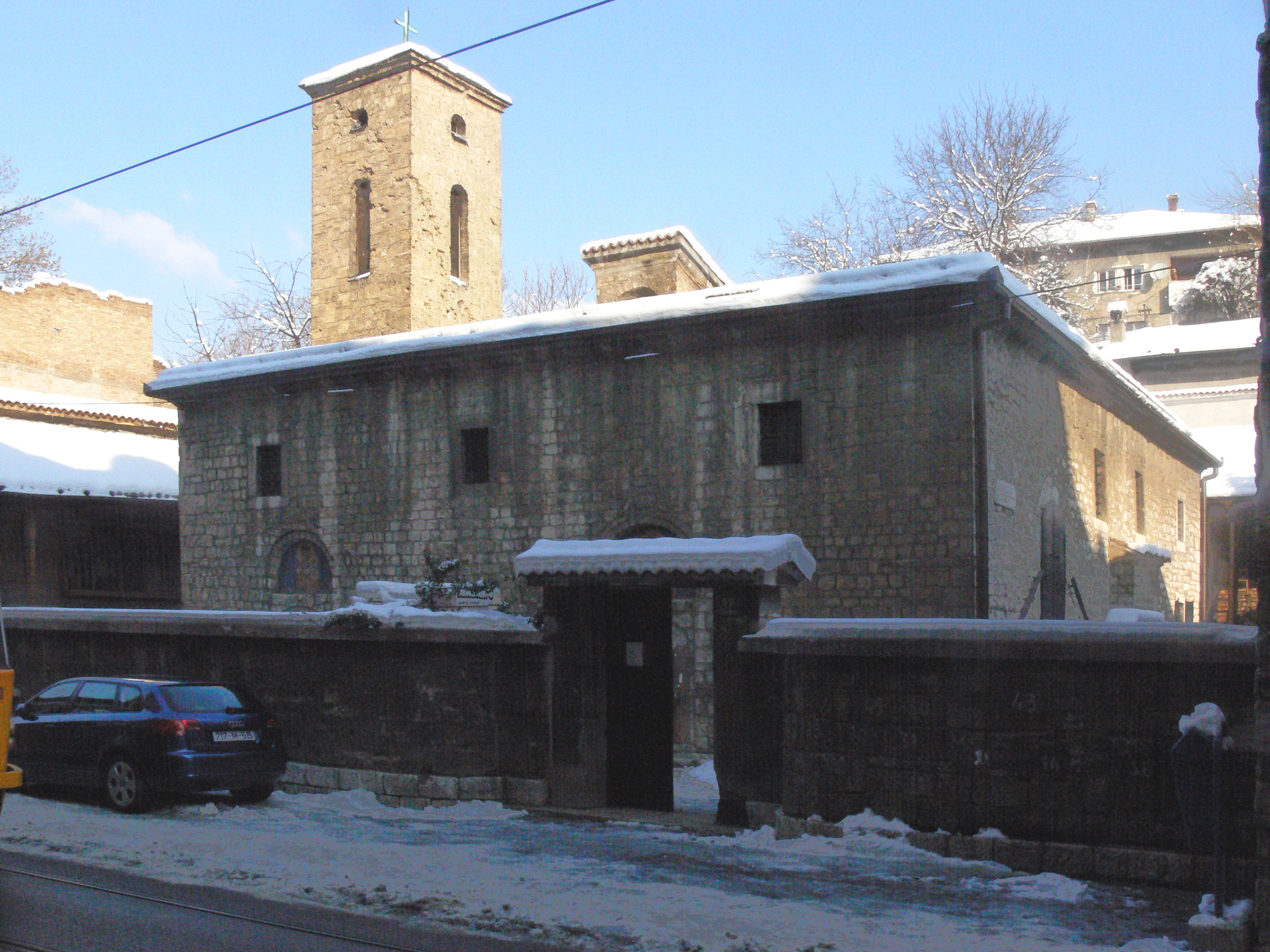
Old Orthodox Church in Sarajevo, 16th century

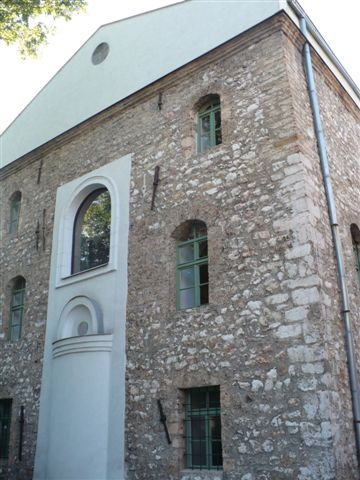
The Old Synagogue, today the Jewish Museum of Bosnia and Herzegovina, was the first Sephardi temple in Sarajevo, built between 1581 and 1587.

During the 16th century a number of commercial facilities was built, such as bezistans, hans, and caravanserais. Sarajevo was an important center of trade in the Balkans and had three bezistans (today the Gazi Husrev-begov bezistan and Brusa bezistan are still standing). There were colonies of Venetian and Ragusan traders, and Baščaršija had approximately 12,000 commercial and craft shops.

After the earthquake in 1640 and several fires in 1644 and 1656, Sarajevo was burned and devastated by the troops of Prince Eugene of Savoy in 1697. Travel writer Evliya Çelebi wrote:

"The čaršija has in everything, one thousand and eighty stores that are a model of beauty. The čaršija is very attractive and built according to plan."

The city of Sarajevo did not expand significantly until the 19th century. With the Austro-Hungarian occupation in 1878, foreign architects wanted to rebuild Sarajevo into a modern European city. A fire contributed to this process, destroying parts of the Stari Grad.

With the liberation of Sarajevo in 1945 after the Second World War, a committee decided that the market should be gradually demolished, believing that it had no role in a modern city. However, the plans were cancelled, and the buildings were left standing.

== Important buildings ==
- Havadža Durak Mosque, better known as Baščaršija Mosque
- Emperor's Mosque
- Gazi Husrev-beg Mosque
- Morića Han
- Old Church
- Old Synagogue (Stari Hram or Old Temple), home of the Jewish Museum of Bosnia and Herzegovina
- New Synagogue (Novi Hram or New Temple), home of the Novi Hram Gallery
- Vijećnica
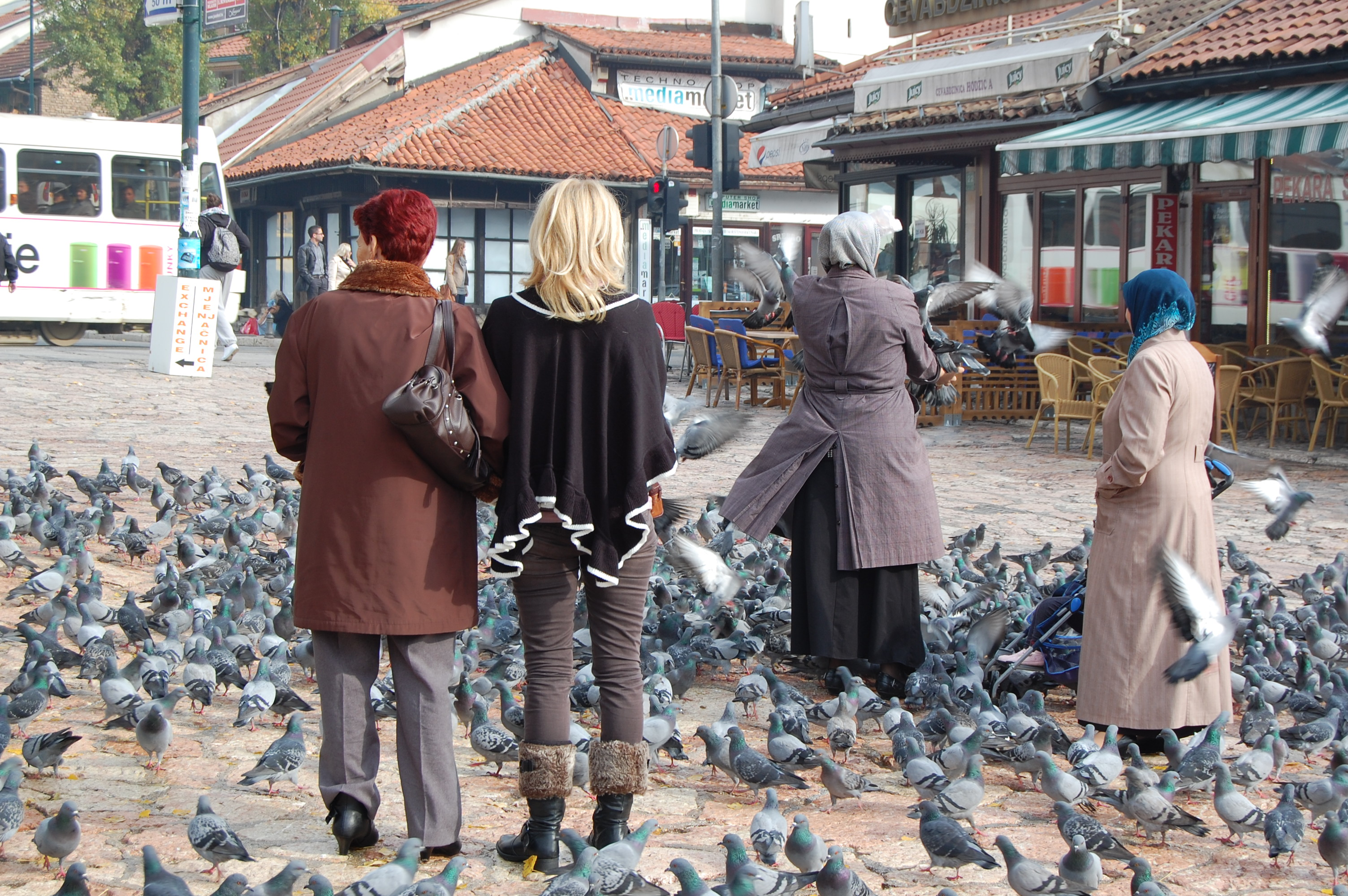
Feeding pigeons at Baščaršija

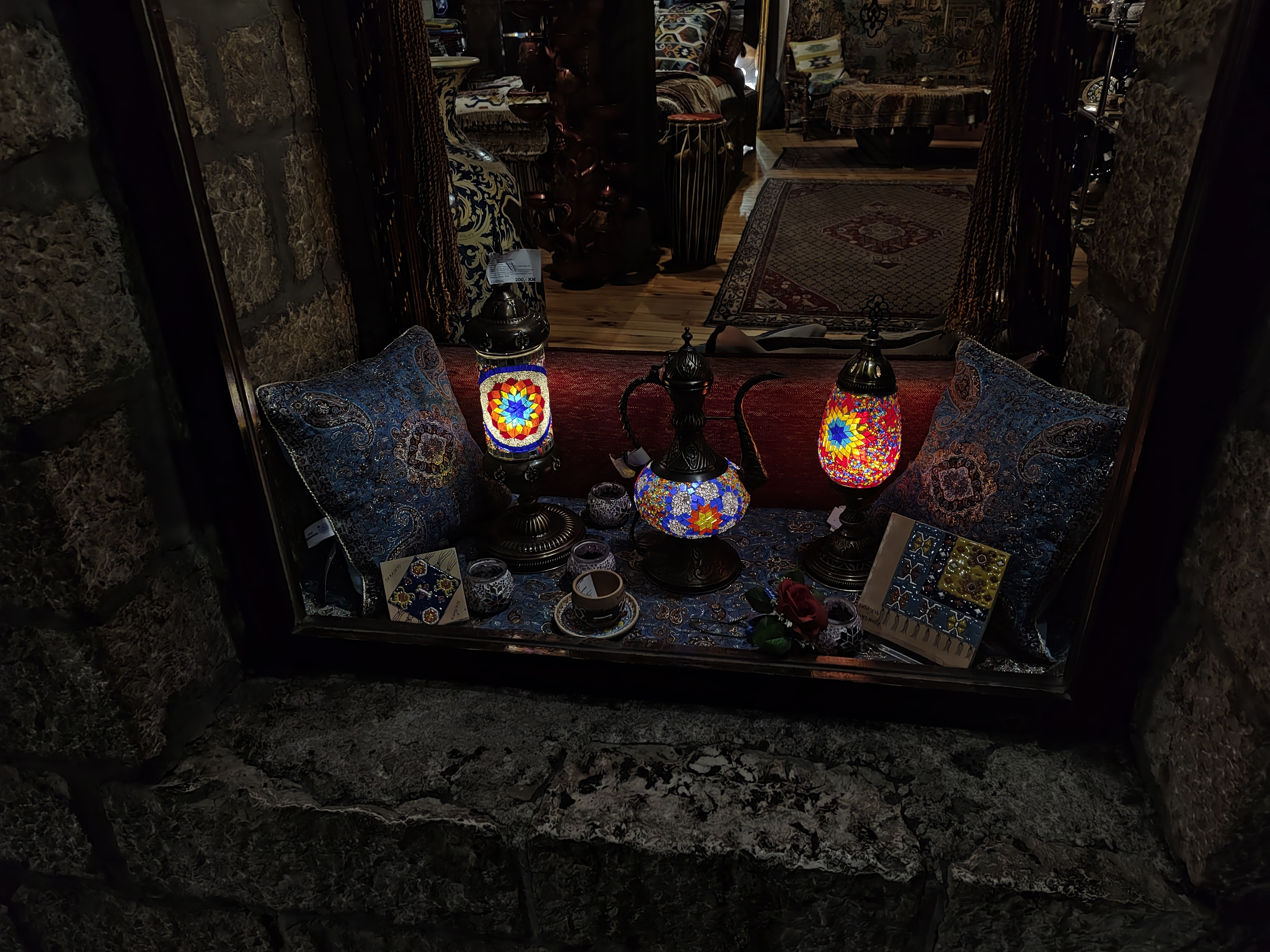
Iranian style lamps at the Baščaršija Old Market

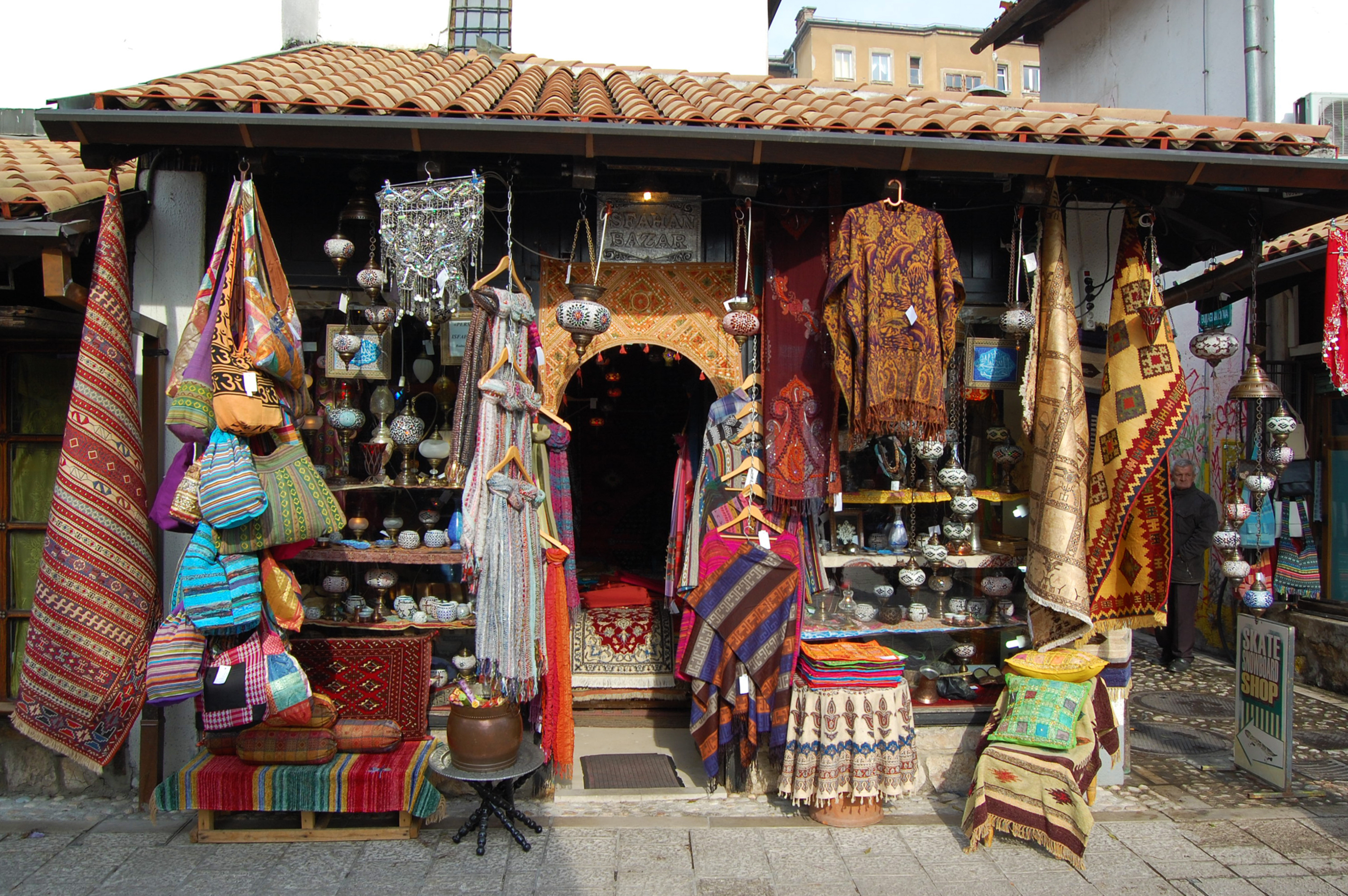
Sarači street in Sarajevo

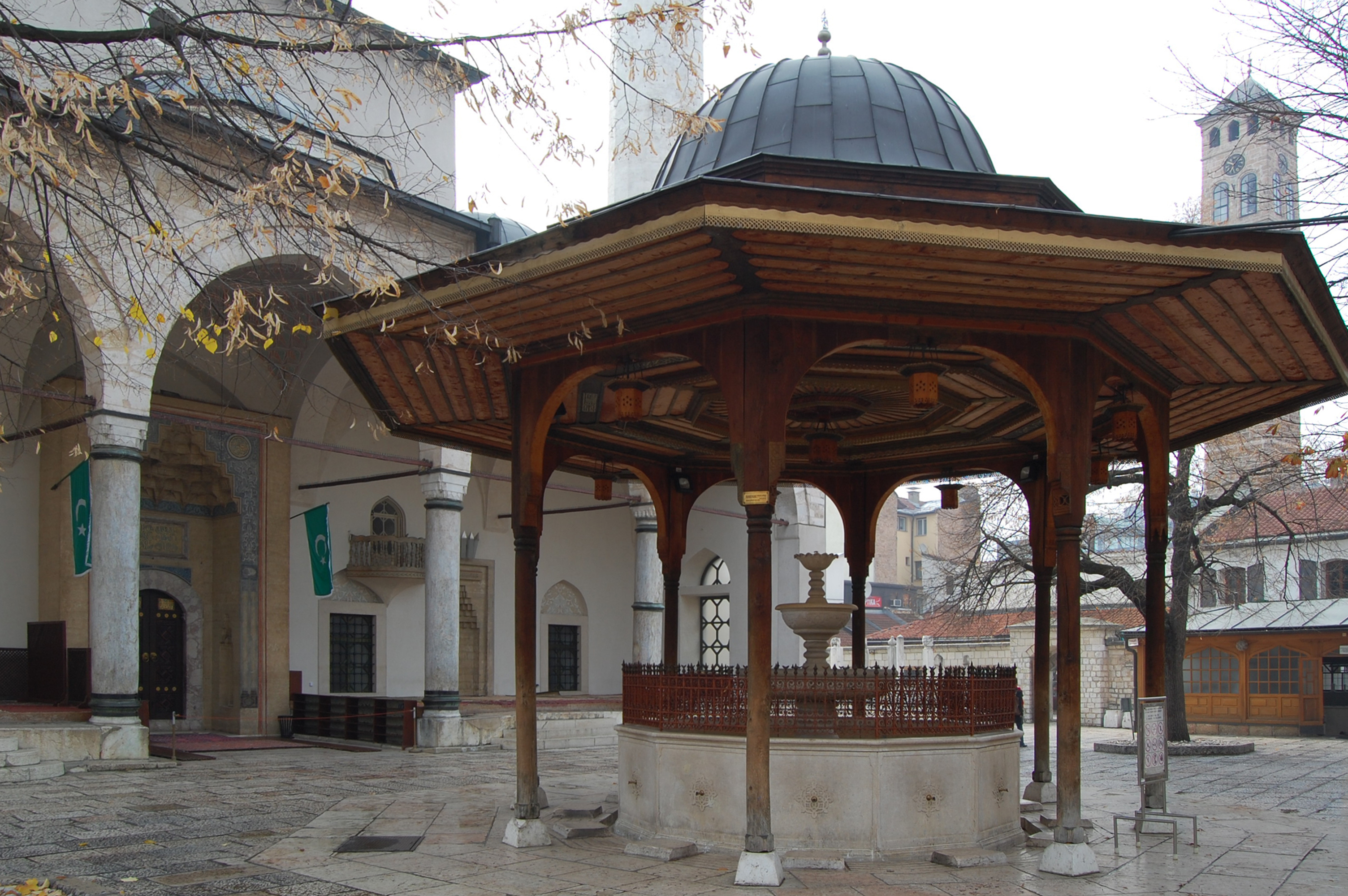
Gazi Husrev-beg's Mosque

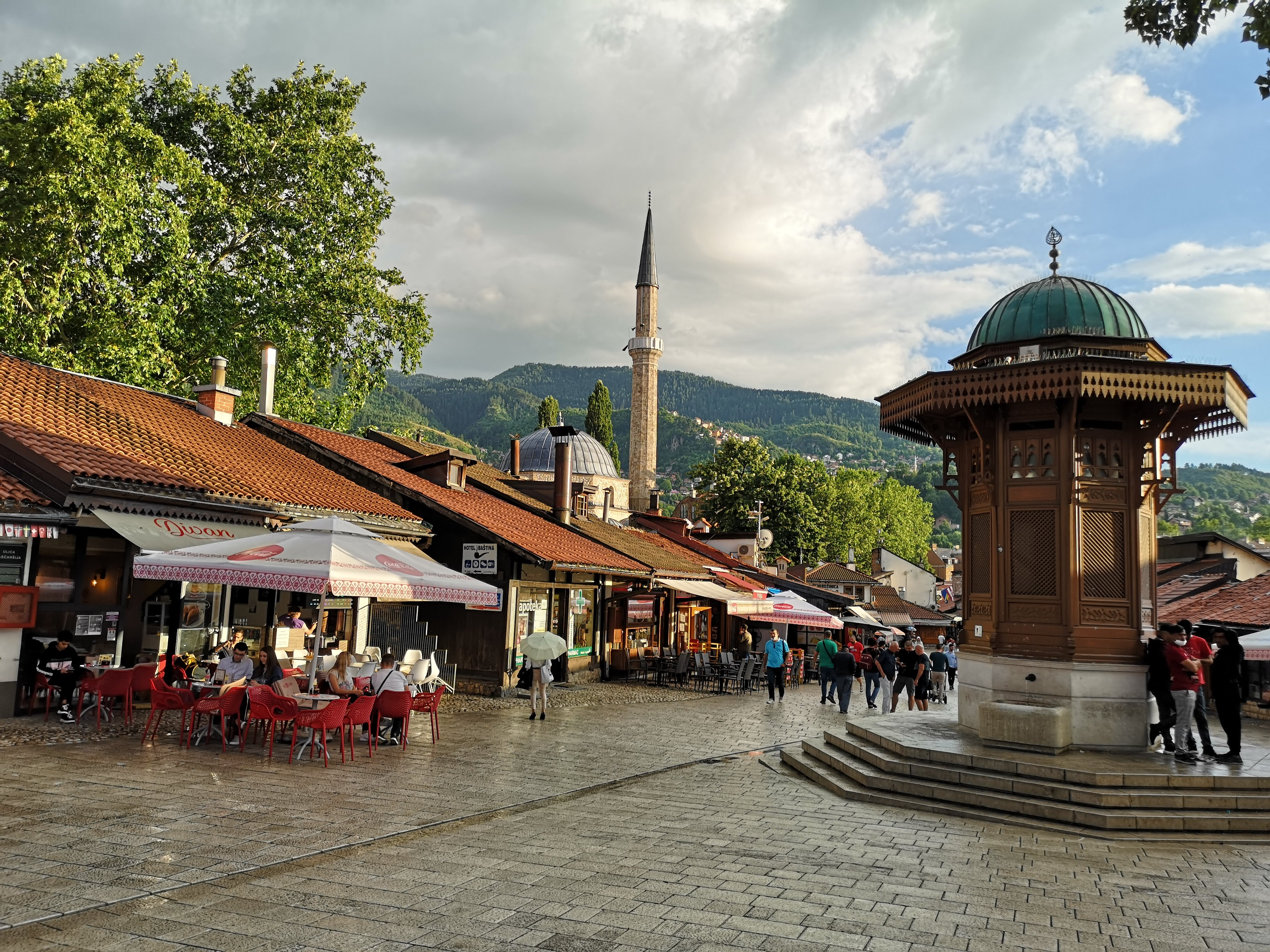
The entrance to the Baščaršija district, the old town of Sarajevo, including the Sebilj fountain

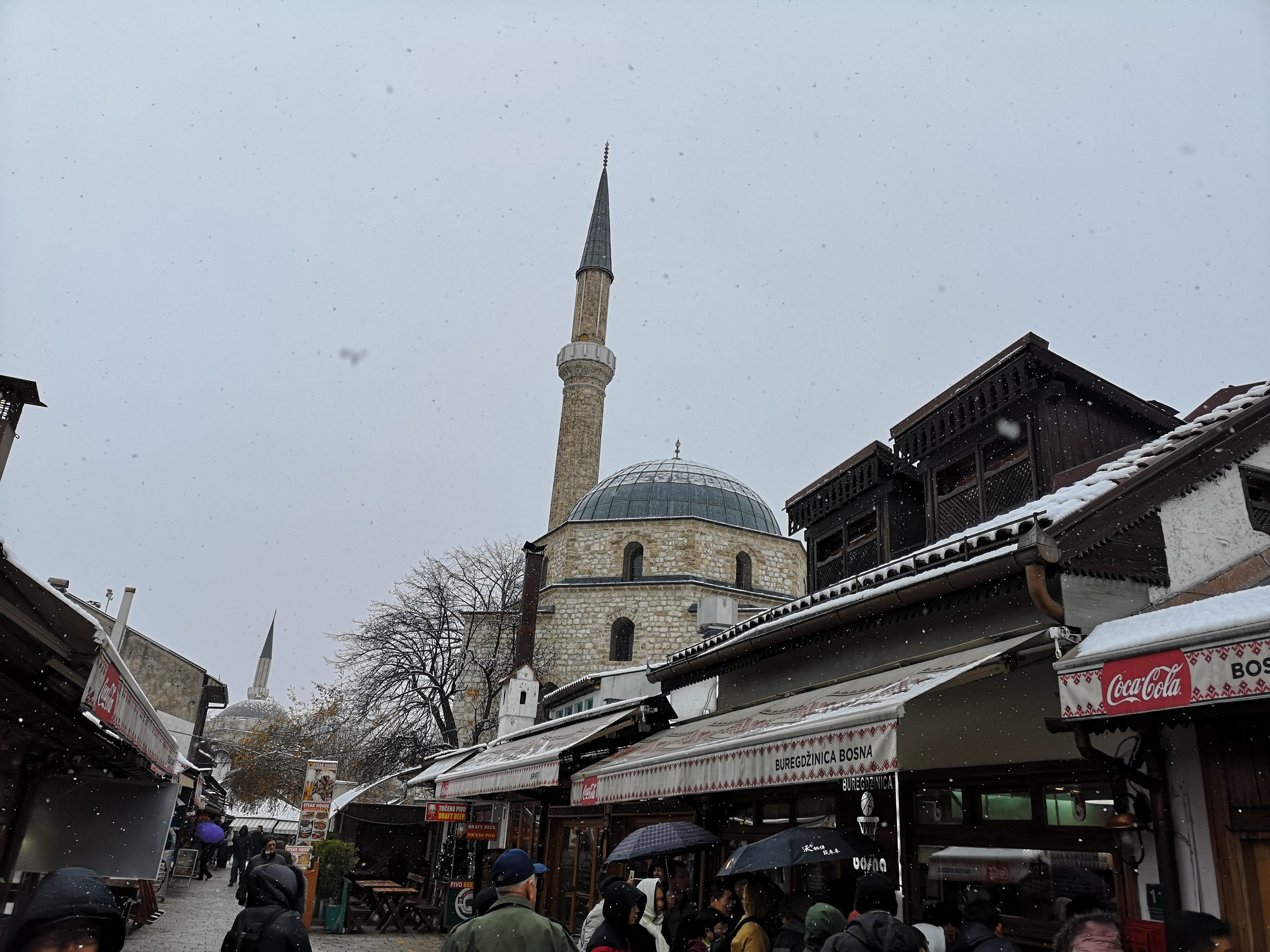
Baščaršija under the snow

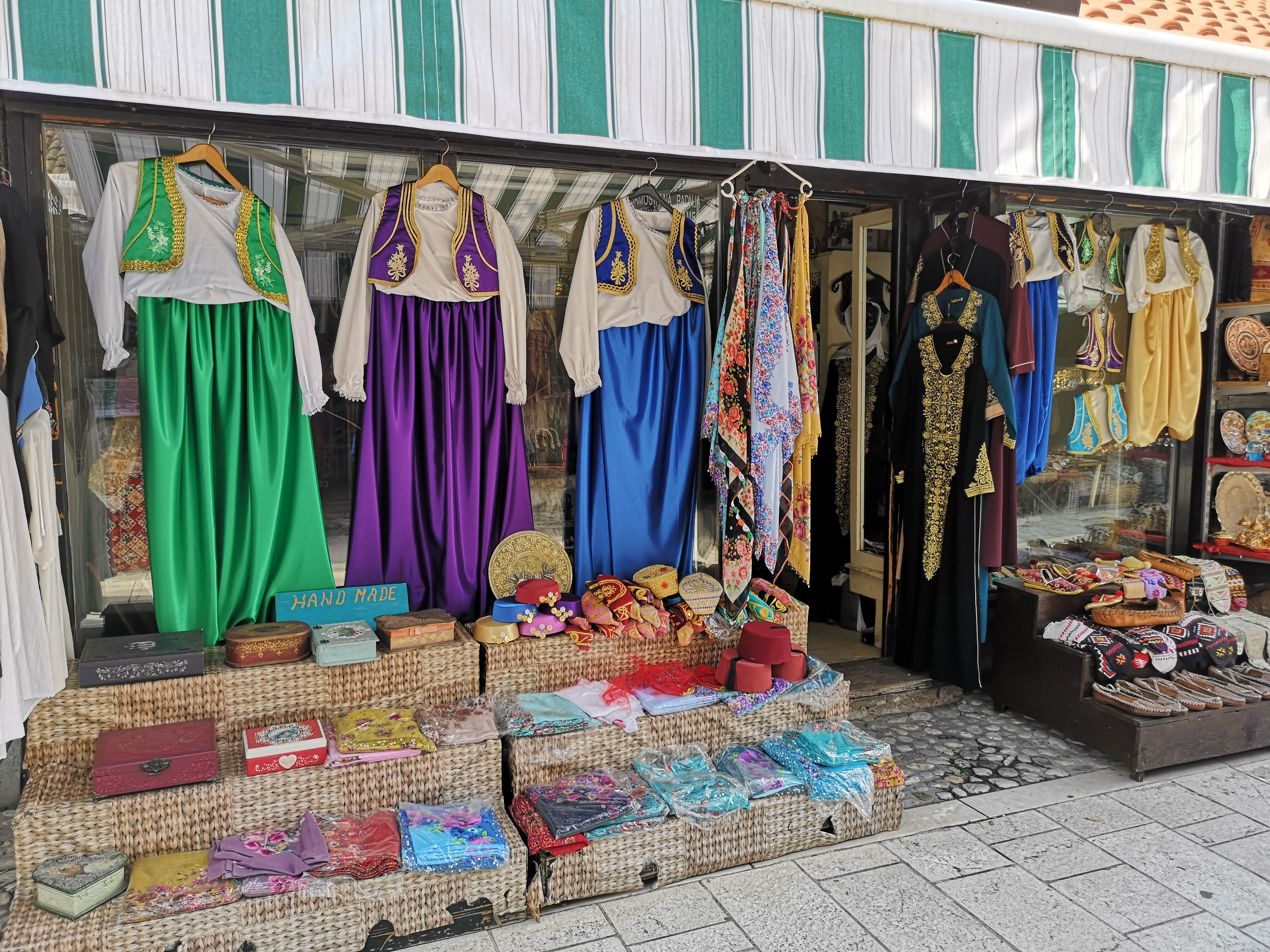
Traditional Bosnian clothing sold in the Baščaršija district

== See also ==
- Baščaršija Nights
- Stari Grad, Sarajevo
