= Ferhat Pasha Mosque (Sarajevo) =

Mosque in Sarajevo, Bosnia and Herzegovina

Ferhadija Mosque
- Ferhat-pašina džamija
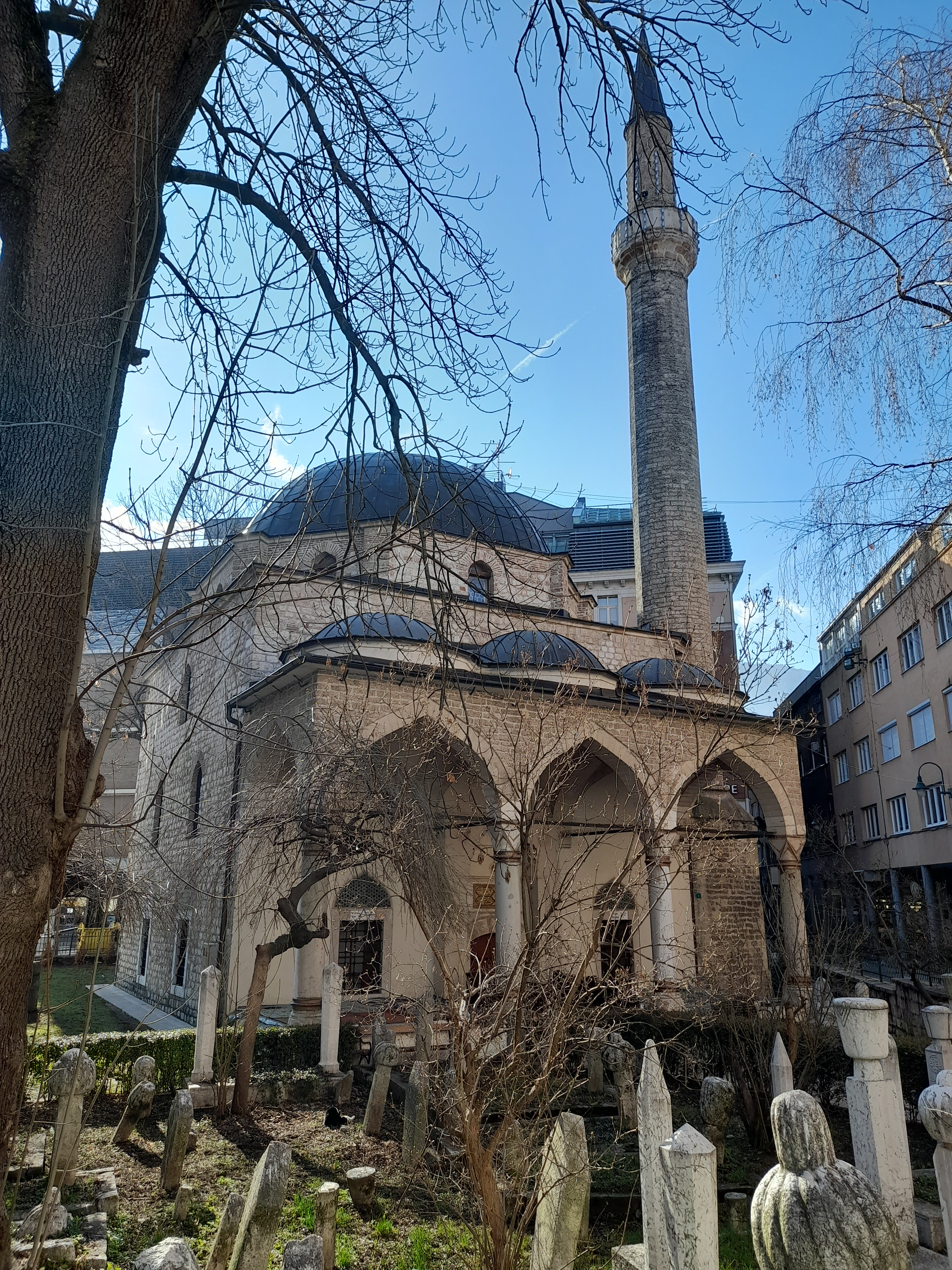
- The mosque in 2025

- Location of the mosque in Sarajevo

Religion
- Affiliation: Sunni Islam
- Ecclesiastical or organizational status: Mosque
- Status: Active

Location
- Location: Baščaršija, Sarajevo
- Country: Bosnia and Herzegovina
- Interactive map of Ferhadija Mosque
- Coordinates: 43°51′32″N 18°25′38″E

Architecture
- Type: Mosque
- Style: Ottoman
- Completed: 16th century

Specifications
- Dome: 4
- Minaret: 1

The Ferhadija Mosque (Bosnian: Ferhat-pašina džamija; Turkish: Ferhad Paşa Camii), also known as the Ferhat Pasha Mosque, is a mosque located in the Baščaršija neighbourhood of the city of Sarajevo, in Bosnia and Herzegovina. The mosque was built in the 16th century by Bosnian Sanjak-bey (governor) Ferhad-beg Vuković, a descendant of the famous medieval Vuković family.

== Overview ==
This mosque has one dome above the prayer area and three small domes at the cloister and is one of the greatest achievements of Bosnia and Herzegovina’s 16th century Ottoman and Islamic architecture. The Ferhadija mosque reflects the full maturity of the classical Ottoman style-domed mosque, portico with small domes, and beautiful built-on minaret.

Research works on the painted decoration inside the mosque carried out in 1964–1965 revealed five painted layers dating from various periods. The oldest and extremely valuable decorations of the first layer date from the 16th century (in the dome, on the cornice and pendentives, the base of the corner calottes, the mihrab and the lunettes of the lower row of windows), belonging to the group known as Rumi ornament, which were also to be seen in the Aladža Mosque in Foča. The next layers (on the calottes, central part of the mihrab, and surface of the dome) consists of purely floral decorations with the features of 18th-century style. The third and fourth layers date from 1878, and the first quarter of the 20th century.

The mosque was damaged during the Bosnian War in 1992–1995.

== See also ==
- Islam in Bosnia and Herzegovina
- List of mosques in Bosnia and Herzegovina
