= Khosrow =

Khosrow (Persian: خسرو) may refer to:

- Khosrow (name), a masculine given name of Iranian origin, also used as a title.

== Places ==
- Khosrow, Iran (disambiguation), several places
- Khosrov, Armenia
- Khosrov Forest State Reserve, in Armenia
- Xosrov, Azerbaijan

== Other uses ==
- Khosrow and Shirin, a tragic romance by Persian poet Nizami Ganjavi
- Khusrau (crater), on Saturn's moon Enceladus

== See also ==
- Khasru (disambiguation), the Bengali language equivalent, and its derivative Khasruzzaman
- Hüsrev, the Turkish language equivalent
- Kaykhusraw (disambiguation)
- Cosroe Dusi (1808–1859), Italian painter
- Khosrovidukht, 8th-century Armenian hymnographer and poetess
- Khosrowshahi, Iranian surname
