= Hüsrev =

Hüsrev (Turkish: Hüsrev), also spelt Hüsref, is a Turkish given name derived from the Persian name "Khusraw", having the same meaning.

== People ==
- Ahmet Hüsrev Altan (born 1950), Turkish journalist and author
- Ali Hüsrev Bozer (1925–2020), Turkish politician
- Deli Husrev Pasha (1495–1544), Ottoman governor
- Gazi Husrev Bey (1484–1541), Bosnian Ottoman governor
- Gazi Hüsrev Pasha (died 1632), Ottoman Grand Vizier
- Koca Hüsrev Mehmed Pasha (died 1855), Ottoman Grand Admiral
- Hüsrev Gerede (1884–1962), Ottoman and Turkish officer and diplomat
- Husref Musemić (born 1961), Bosnian football manager
- Husref Redžić (1919–1984), Bosnian intellectual and scholar
- Molla Hüsrev, 15th-century Ottoman scholar
- Münir Hüsrev Göle (1890–1955), Turkish politician

== Structures ==
- Gazi Husrev Bey's Madrasa, madrasa in Sarajevo
- Gazi Husrev-beg Mosque, a mosque in Sarajevo, Bosnia and Herzegovina
- Gazi Husrev-beg Library, a library in Sarajevo, Bosnia and Herzegovina
- Gazi Husrev-begov Hanikah, defunct khanqah in Sarajevo
- Gazi Husrev-begov bezistan, bezistan in Sarajevo
- Gazi Husrev-beg's Hamam, Turkish bath turned into a cultural institute in Sarajevo
- Hüsreviye Mosque, a mosque in Aleppo, Syria
