= Gazi Husrev-begov Hanikah =

Former khanqah in Sarajevo

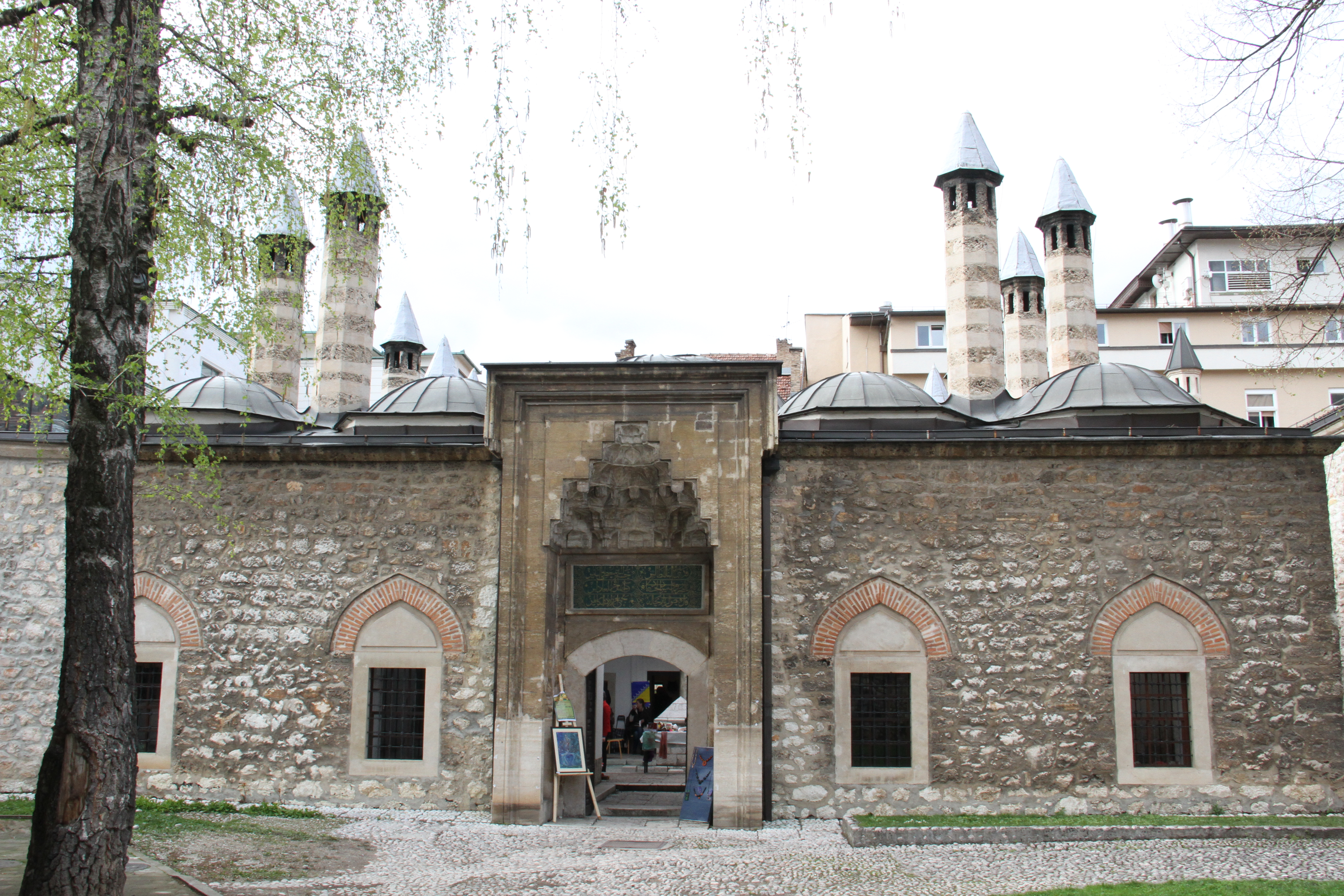
- Hanikah
- Interactive map of the Gazi Husrev-begov Hanikah area
- Etymology: Arabic: house = hana and dervish = gah

General information
- Type: Higher education
- Architectural style: Classical Ottoman
- Location: Baščaršija, Sarajevo, Bosnia and herzegovina
- Named for: Gazi Husrev-beg
- Owner: Gazi huserv-beg's Vakuf, JU Islamic Community in Bosnia and Herzegovina
- Affiliation: Dervish order

Height
- Roof: domed

Gazi Husrev-beg's Hanikah (from the Persian hanegah - hane-house and gah - the Arabic hanikah, hanekah - the place of residence of dervishes and sheikhs) is a hanikah in Sarajevo. Tesavuf (Islamic mysticism) was studied in hanikah, and today it has an artistic purpose.

== History ==
The first historical mention is in the vakufnama of Gazi Husrev-beg from 1531. Gazi Husrev-beg's vakufnama from 1531 is the first of his vakufnamas and was written for the mosque, imaret (public kitchen) and hanikah. It is assumed that this building was built a year before. The waqf deed determined that the hanikah must be headed by a sheikh of the Halvetian order. He chose this order because Gazi Husrev-beg also belonged to this school, it was very widespread and popular in Anatolia and Rumelia of his time. This order was very consistent and strict in the upbringing of dervishes and had great respect for the leaders in power. Later, significant representatives of this order clashed with the Ottoman ruling elite, which is why the school changed its administration, with the sheikhs of the Naqshbandi Tariqat came to head the hanikah at the beginning of the 19th century. Gazi Husrev-beg's Hanikah is unique among all hanikahs in Bosnia and Herzegovina, namely in Sarajevo and Mostar.

Together with the Gazi Husrev-beg mosque and the Gazi Husrev-beg medresa, it forms the architectural, urban and aesthetic whole at the center of Old Sarajevo. It was built by the end of 1531 on the north side, across from the Gazi Husrev-beg mosque. By the end of 1531, Gazi Husrev-beg had built a mosque, a hanikah, an imaret (public kitchen) and a musafirhana. In the hanikah, the dervishes, in addition to their rituals and zikr, acquired all the necessary knowledge after completing the school went all over BiH on a mission to transmit Sufi doctrine.

In 1749–50 hanikah was destroyed in fire, so a new building was erected. In 1756 the building caught fire again and burned. It was rebuilt in 1779. The fire broke out again in 1832. During the construction of the northern wing of the Đulagin Palace, today the building of the Gazi Husrev-beg Madrasa, the hanikah was almost completely destroyed. Almost all of Gazi Husrev-beg's endowed buildings burned down and the hanikah perished again. For some time the institution was located in the premises of the musafirhana near the clock tower, which burned down on May 25, 1852, and after that the hanikah was returned to its old place. Damaged and repaired during the Austro-Hungarian rule, but the interventions were made by an unprofessional workers. In the 19th and early 20th centuries, Hanikah and the madrasa gradually grew into an educational institution of modern type. Thus, the permanent dervishes disappeared, although the students of the madrasa performed dervish rituals for some time.

During the extension of the new building of the Gazi Husrev-beg Madrasa in 1931, a significant part of this building was demolished, and the reconstruction was completed only in 1998. The new hanikah was reconstructed in 2000. Today it is used for the needs of Gazi Husrev-beg Madrasa, for promotions and exhibitions.

== Description ==
There were 14 rooms and semahanas (space for religious ceremonies) in the hanikah. The semahana occupy an area of three rooms and a porch. The semahana and some rooms were domed. In 1749, after a fire, a new building was erected which had 12 rooms for dervishes, a semahana and a room for sheikhs and service-rooms. In the hanikah, which is renovated in 2000, the inner courtyard is now covered with a movable glass roof.

== Protection ==
In 2006, the Commission to Preserve National Monuments of BiH declared the building complex, Gazi Husrev-beg Madrasa with the Site and Remains of Hanikah in Sarajevo, a National Monument of Bosnia and Herzegovina.

== See also ==
- Gazi Husrev-beg
- Gazi Husrev-begova džamija
- Gazi Husrev-begov bezistan
- Gazi Husrev-begova medresa
- Tašlihan
