= Sack of Sarajevo =

1697 looting and burning of Sarajevo

- Part of the Great Turkish War and the Ottoman–Habsburg wars
- Depiction of Eugene of Savoy in Bosnia
Date	23 October 1697
Location	Bosnasaray, Ottoman Empire present-day Sarajevo, Bosnia and Herzegovina; 43°51′23″N 18°24′47″E
Result	Holy League victory
Territorial changes	Most of Sarajevo burned to the ground

Belligerents
Holy Roman Empire	Ottoman Empire

Commanders and leaders
Prince Eugene of Savoy	Gazi Mehmed Pasha # Sarı Ahmed Pasha

Strength
6,500 infantry 12 small cannons	Unknown

Casualties and losses
Unknown	Very heavy; most of the Muslim population enslaved or massacred

The Sack of Sarajevo took place on 23 October 1697 and was committed by raiding Austrian troops led by Prince Eugene of Savoy. At this time the Great Turkish War was being fought. Shortly after the Austrian victory at the Battle of Zenta (today: Senta, Serbia), an opportunity arose for the Austrians to launch a surprise attack into Ottoman Bosnia. The Austrians enslaved and massacred the city's Muslim population, after which they burnt the city to ground.

The intrusion into Ottoman Bosnia and the subsequent sacking of Sarajevo left the city plague-infected and burned to the ground. After Prince Eugene's men had thoroughly looted the city, they set it on fire and nearly destroyed all of it in one day. Only a few neighbourhoods, some mosques, and an Orthodox church were left standing.

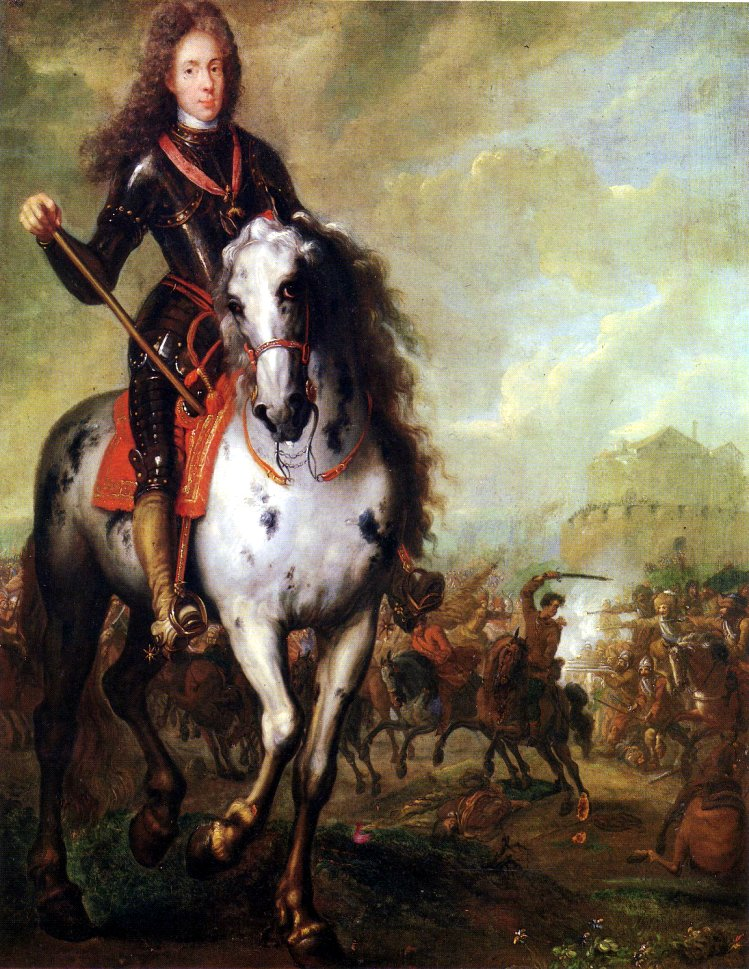
Portrait of Prince Eugene of Savoy (1663–1736) c. 1700. Flemish School.

== Background ==
After a few years of peace between the Ottoman Empire and various Western powers, another attack was launched against the Habsburg monarchy by the Ottomans, almost capturing Vienna. However, the Polish king John III Sobieski, along with his Christian alliance won the Battle of Vienna (1683), forever stalling Ottoman expansion into Europe. After the capture of Buda by the Christian forces in 1686, many Serbs from the Pannonian Plain decided to join the troops of the Habsburg monarchy. On the 11th of September in modern-day Vojvodina, the Battle of Zenta was fought. The battle was the most decisive engagement of the Great Turkish War: it saw the Ottomans suffer an overwhelming defeat by an imperial force half as large sent by Emperor Leopold I. The Turks attempted to cross the river Tisza at Zenta. Their force was personally led by the sultan Mustafa II. In a surprise attack, Habsburg Imperial forces commanded by Prince Eugene of Savoy engaged the Turkish army while it was crossing the Tisza river. Prince Eugene's forces inflicted thousands of casualties, including the Grand Vizier Elmas Mehmed Pasha. Prince Eugene's army dispersed the Ottoman forces, capturing the Ottoman treasury, and came away with such emblems of high Ottoman authority as the Seal of the Empire which had never been captured before. Prince Eugene's forces, unlike the Turks, had exceptionally light casualties.

Austria gained complete control over Banat. Because the Ottoman army was scattered, the Austrians had complete freedom of action in Slavonia and Ottoman Bosnia for almost 6 weeks, just as Prince Eugene was planning to raid Ottoman Bosnia.

== Intrusion into Bosnia ==
=== Prelude ===
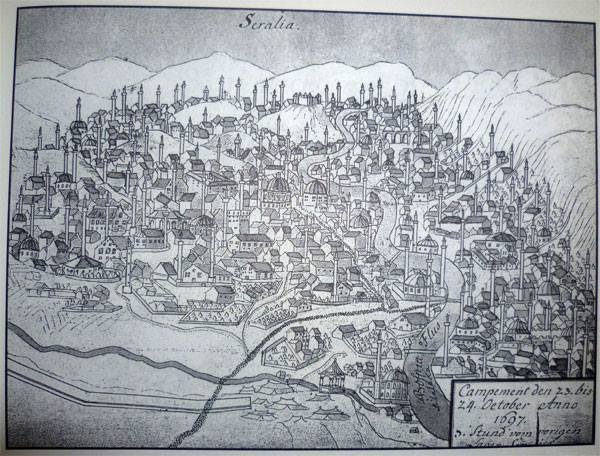
Seralia (Sarajevo) as envisioned in 1697

On 6 October, Prince Eugene left Osijek in Slavonia with 6,500 warriors (4000 spearmen, 2500 infantry with rifles, 12 small cannons and, two mortars). After crossing the river Sava to get into Bosnia, the small town of Brod was plundered, this marked the beginning of his intrusion into Bosnia. Upon his arrival in Bosnia, Prince Eugene and his army followed the river Bosna downwards until they reached Sarajevo. On their way to Sarajevo they encountered the Doboj Fortress. They sent an ultimatum to the people there, but they refused to surrender. After artillery shelling of the fortress, it finally fell on 16 October. After the victory at Doboj, Prince Eugene's army marched to the town of Maglaj where they encountered less resistance and captured it quickly. After the capture of Maglaj, Prince Eugene's army marched on to Žepče. Even though there was resistance at Žepče, local desertion became the reason for it falling as fast as Maglaj. Heavy resistance was encountered at Zenica and Vranduk. The Vranduk Fortress was ultimately bypassed since it proved extremely hard to conquer. The weaker arms and smaller size of the resistance forces in Zenica let Prince Eugen conquer it on 20 October. In the end, it took Prince Eugene and the Austrians 11 days to get to the medieval town of Visoko. Upon their arrival they decided to loot and set the town on fire, completely destroying it.

=== Arriving in Sarajevo ===
The army was on the outskirts of Sarajevo the same day and the next day on the 22nd of October. Prince Eugene sent a bugler and flag-bearer to Sarajevo, with a request to surrender the city and avoid casualties. The letter he sent to the Sarajevo authorities stated:

"I, Eugen Prince, Duke of Savoy and Piedmont, General Field Marshal of His Majesty the Emperor of Rome and King of Hungary and Bohemia, Commander-in-Chief of a Dragoon Regiment and Commanding General of His Majesty's main army, which is at war with the Ottoman Porte, do hereby give for the information of the excellent citizens and all the inhabitants, that since by God's grace we with this same army on September 11th of this year defeated the great sultan in the camp near Senta on the Tisza, we are here in the province of Bosnia and that we are near the noble city of Sarajevo, since we with the victorious weapons of His Imperial and Royal Majesty, our most gracious master, have successfully conquered all the positions and fortresses we encountered, and that as a result our further penetration has the less obstacles, as we have already reached the Sarajevo plain. We did not come to this land with the intention of sacrificing more human blood to the righteous imperial weapon, but to take care of those who seek mercy and submit to the Roman emperor with love and kindness, we decided out of special consideration for Sarajevo to send this letter with a note, if you want to save yourself from evil, send us one or more envoys, but immediately, because otherwise we will continue our march without hesitation, and then we will not consider anything, because there will not be time to come to an agreement. This admonition of ours was made in good faith, but we declare, heeded, and if you remain persistent, that our kindness will turn into severity, and we will destroy everything with sword and fire. We will not spare even the child in the mother's womb because heavy artillery is ready. Let no one be fooled by the weak hope of resistance, because we still well remember how much Ottoman blood was spilled in this campaign and how those who resisted our powerful weapons were treated in these past days, so that even the Bosnian Pasha's ćehaja had to flee. We repeat our benevolent admonition and assure you that we will give a safe escort both here and there to those whom you send us."

The letter that Prince Eugen sent wasn't replied to. Instead, both the bugler and flag bearer were attacked and robbed while their letter was read aloud in town. As Prince Eugen found out about this, he ordered an attack on the city. The Prince Eugene's attack and subsequent burning of Sarajevo is documented in his diary:

October 23, 1697: "I opened a front line on the right side of the city and sent one division to loot and plunder: the Turks have brought all their valuables to security, but we could still find enough spoils. In the evening, a fire broke out. The city is large and fully open. It has 120 beautiful mosques."October 24, 1697: "We have completely burned down the city and all outskirts. Our troops, which have chased the enemy, have fetched spoils, women and children too. Many Christians are coming to us and begging for protection. They are coming with all their belongings in our camp because they want to leave the land and join us. I hope that I will be able to take all of them over the Sava river."

By the 25th Prince Eugene and his forces had decided to retreat and return to the lands of the Habsburg Monarchy. The Austrians plundered even more on their way back home, near Maglaj, a detachment of the army deviated from the main route and separated in the direction of Tešanj, bombarding the town there and then rejoining the army near Doboj. Prince Eugene's diary ends with a description of the return of the units via Osijek, through forests and swampy areas to the winter camps in Slavonia, where the bulk Prince Eugene's army was already stationed. Upon arrival home they were awaited as heroes because of their victory at the Battle of Zenta.

== Aftermath ==
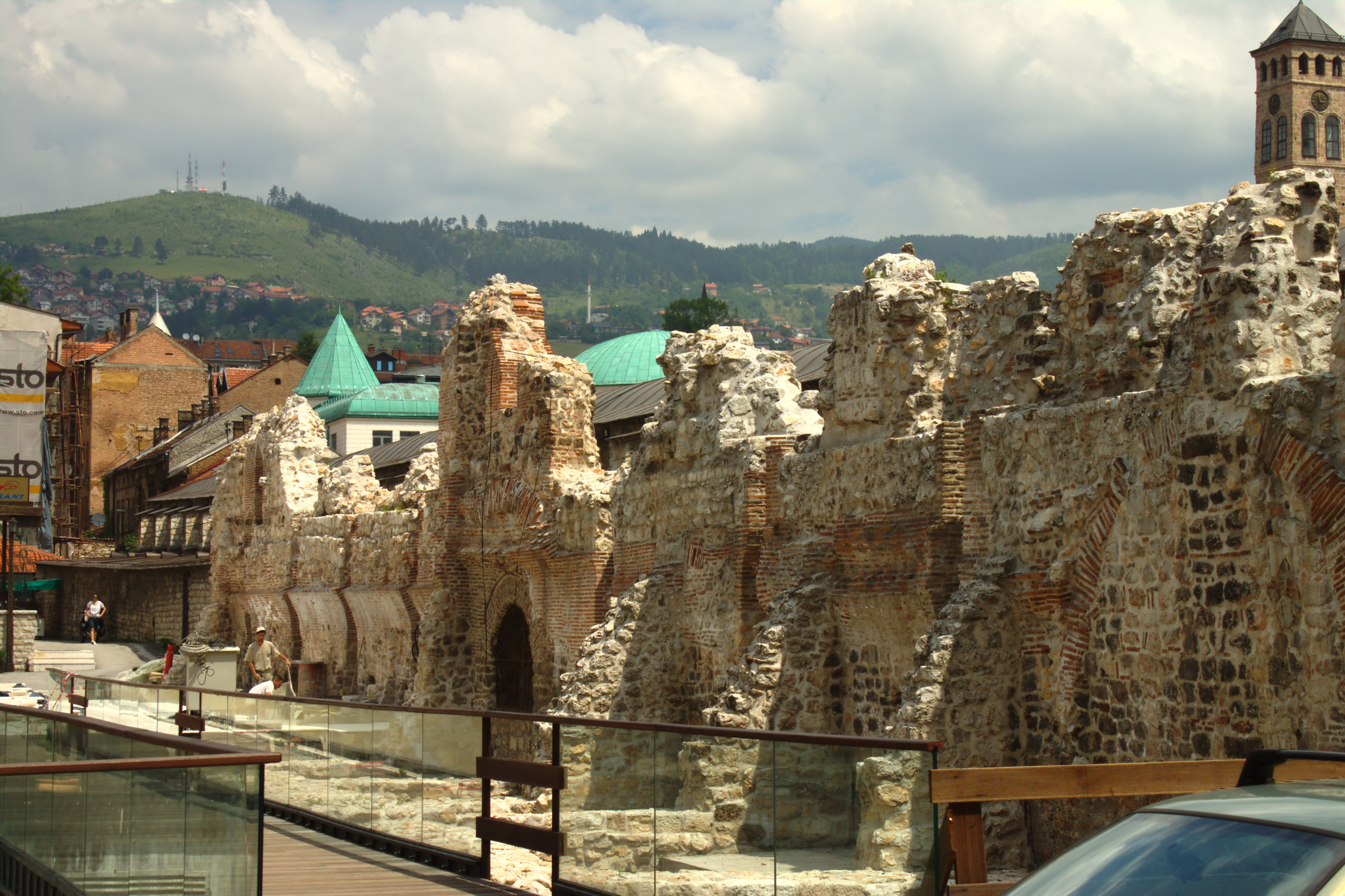
Tašlihan, an inn that was damaged during the fire 1697.

The Habsburg raid manage to destroy notable architectures in the city as the center of the town was completely destroyed. Almost all of the inns and workshops were lost. The Sarajevo Bezistan and Gazi Husrev Begs complex were severely damaged by the fire as well. Most mosques were also destroyed by the fires and almost all the imams and muezzins died as well. An unknown Sarajevan poet wrote about the destruction with which the Habsburg Army brought upon the town.

"Rich and poor now sigh and weep, gardens and gardens were left desolate. Those who have never read books about love cannot understand this violence and wrath of heaven. Many who did not know how to price their property now search for crusts of bread. Thousands of months will pass, and we will not rise from this desolation. A sea of unhappiness and hardship flooded in and rose above our heads."

Before, the city of Sarajevo had 80,000 inhabitants in the 1660s. According to some writers, the city had only 30,000 inhabitants in the early 19th century, mostly those living on the outskirts of what once was the city. The inhabitants of Sarajevo had to rebuild the city not just structurally, but culturally and politically as well. By then, the seat of the Bosnian government had already been transferred to Travnik, meaning that Sarajevo lost its status as the main city of Bosnia. Prince Eugene's sacking of Sarajevo ruined it to the point that it took almost 200 years to recover.
