= Khosroshahi =

Khosroshahi (Persian: خسروشاهی) is an Iranian surname. Notable people with the surname include:

- Behnam Khosroshahi (born 1989), Iranian cyclist
- Hadi Khosroshahi (1939–2020), Iranian cleric and diplomat

== See also ==
- Khosrowshahi
