= Khosrow, Iran =

Khosrow (Persian: خسرو) in Iran may refer to:

- Khosrow, Andika, Khuzestan Province
- Khosrow Beyg, Markazi Province
- Khosrow Beyk Rural District, in Markazi Province
- Khosrow, Tehran
- Khosrow Castle, in Ardabil County, Ardabil Province
