= Khosrow (name) =

Male given name

Khosrow /xʊsˈroʊ/ is a male given name of Iranian origin, most notably held by Khosrow I of Sassanid Persia, but also by other people in various locations and languages. In some times and places, and in some cases has been used as a dynastic name.

== Variants ==
Khosrow is the Modern Persian variant. The word ultimately comes from Proto-Iranian *Hu-sravah ("with good reputation"), itself ultimately from Proto-Indo-European *h₁su- ("good") + *ḱléwos ("fame").

The name has been attested in Avesta as Haosravangha (Avestan: 𐬵𐬀𐬊𐬯𐬭𐬀𐬎𐬎𐬀𐬢𐬵𐬀 Haosrauuaŋha) and Haosravah (Haosrauuah), as the name of the legendary Iranian king Kay Khosrow. This is the oldest attestation.

The name was used by various rulers of Parthian Empire. In Parthian-language inscriptions, it is spelled as hwsrw (𐭇𐭅𐭎𐭓𐭅), which may be variously transcribed and pronounced. The Latin form was Osroes or Osdroes. The Old Armenian form was Khosrov (Խոսրով), derived from Parthian, and was held by several rulers of the Arsacid dynasty of Armenia. The name is still used in modern Armenian.

Notable as to the use of Khosrow as a title is the father of Mirian III of Iberia who was known as k'asre (Old Georgian). This led to confusion, as some historians thought that Mirian III must therefore be the son of a Sasanian ruler, and not a Parthian one.

The name was notably used by several rulers of Sassanian Empire. In their native language, Middle Persian, the name has been spelt variously as hwslwb (Book Pahlavi script:), hwslwb', hwsrwb, hwslwd, and hwsrwd' in Pahlavi scripts. The name has been variously transliterated as follows: Husrō, Husrōy, Xusro, Khusro, Khosrau, Husrav, Husraw, Khusrau, Khusraw, Khusrav, Xusraw, Xusrow, Xosrow, Xosro.* The Greek form was Khosróēs (Χοσρόης) and the Latin form was Chosroes and Cosroe. The Middle Persian word also means "famous" or "of good repute".

The New Persian variant is خسرو, which can be transliterated as Khusraw, Khusrau, Khusrav, Khusru (based on the Classical Persian pronunciation [xʊsˈɾaw]), or Khosrow, Khosro (based on the modern Iranian Persian pronunciations [xosˈɾoʊ̯] and [xosˈɾo]). In New Persian the name also became a common noun meaning '(great) king'.

The word was borrowed into Arabic as Kisrā or Kasrā (كسرى), a variant which come to be used in New Persian (کسری) as well. In Islamic Persia, kisrā became a strong byword for tyrannical pagan kingship, and is used as a general shorthand for Sassanian rulers (hence also Taq-e Kasra, literally "Arc of Kasra"), as pharaoh is used for pre-Islamic Egyptian rulers.

The Turkish variant is Hüsrev, derived from Ottoman Turkish (خسرو), itself from New Persian. The Bengali variant of the word is Khasru.

== Iranian rulers ==
- Khosrow I, Sasanian ruler 531–579
- Khosrow II, Sasanian ruler 590–628
- Khosrow III, Sasanian ruler 630
- Khosrow IV, Sasanian ruler 631–633
- Khosrow (son of Bahram IV), 420
- Khusrau Shah, sultan of the Ghaznavid Empire 1157–1160
- Khusrau Malik, last Sultan of the Ghaznavid Empire, 1160–1186
- Osroes I, c. 109–129
- Osroes II, c. 190

== Kings of Armenia ==
- Khosrov I of Armenia, 198–217
- Khosrov II of Armenia, c. 252
- Khosrov III the Small, 330–339
- Khosrov IV of Armenia, 387–389

== Other people ==
=== Given name ===
- Khosrov of Andzev (fl. 10th century), Armenian writer
- Khosrow Jahanbani (1941–2014), Iranian royal
- Khusrau Khan, Sultan of Delhi for four months in 1320
- Khusrau Mirza (1587–1622), son of Mughal emperor Jahangir
- Cosroe Dusi (1808–1859), Italian painter
- Khosrov bey Sultanov (1879–1947), Azerbaijani statesman
- Khosrov Harutyunyan (b. 1948), Armenian politician
- Khosrow Behbehani, professor of engineering

=== Middle name ===
- Amir Khosrow Afshar (1919–1999), Iranian diplomat and politician
- Hossein Khosrow Ali Vaziri (1942-2023), Iranian-American wrestler and actor

=== Surname ===
- Amir Khusrau (1253–1325), Sufi poet (in Persian language), musician, and scholar of India

== See also ==
- Khosrow (disambiguation)
