= Divović =

South Slavic surname

Origin
- Language: Bosnian
- Meaning: Giant or Colossus
- Region of origin: Bosnia and Herzegovina

Other names
- Variant forms: Divovich, Divovic

Divović is a South Slavic Surname mainly common amongst Bosniaks in Bosnia and Herzegovina.

== History ==
The surname most likely derived from the Bosnian word "Div" meaning "Giant" or "Colossus". The Divović Family were known for being one of the greatest gatekeepers of the Ottoman Empire, they settled In the medieval Hungarian capital of Buda after the Battle of Mohács and the Ottoman Conquest of Hungary. They held and guarded the keys to the gates of houses, hamams, harams etc. of the Ottoman nobility, such as viziers, aghas, pashas and beys. The family left Buda and settled In Bosnia Eyalet In 1686, after It fell under the rule of The Habsburgs and exile of the Muslims of the city. The family settled In the cities of Foča, Sarajevo and Rogatica during the 17th and early 18th century.

== Notable people ==
=== Writers ===
- Mulla Muhamed Mestvica Divović "Vrcanija" (1775-1864), Bosniak writer, poet, astronomer, astrologist and calligraphist from Sarajevo, He also thought Husein-kapetan Gradaščević calligraphy from 1819 to 1821. He wrote his works in Bosnian and Turkish, he also spoke Arabic and Persian.

=== Religion ===
- Nazif-efendija Divović, a Bosniak Islamic qadi from the 18th century and Muallim of the Gazi Husrev-bey Madrasa.

=== Military and war ===
- Nermin Divović, 7-year-old child killed by a Serb sniper on November 18, 1994, during the Siege of Sarajevo.
