= Kaykhusraw =

Kaykhusraw, Kaikhosro, Kaikhosrov, Kaikhosru, Kay Khusraw, Kaykhosrow, Kaykhusraw, or Kekhashru (Persian: کیخسرو) is a masculine given name of Persian origin. It comes from the name of the legendary Persian warrior Kai Khosrow. Notable people with the name include:

== Given name ==
=== Kaikhosro ===
- Kaikhosro, Prince of Mukhrani (died 1629), Georgian tavadi ("prince") of the House of Mukhrani
- Kaikhosro of Kartli (1674–1711), Safavid-appointed king of Kartli
- Kaikhosro I Gurieli (died 1660), Georgian member of the House of Gurieli
- Kaikhosro II Gurieli (1670–1689), Georgian member of the House of Gurieli
- Kaikhosro III Gurieli (died 1751), Georgian member of the House of Gurieli
- Kaikhosro IV Gurieli (died 1829), Georgian member of the House of Gurieli
- Kaikhosro I Jaqeli (1443–1500), Georgian prince and Atabeg of Samtskhe-Saatabago
- Kaikhosro II Jaqeli (1522–1573), Georgian atabeg of the Principality of Samtskhe
- Kaikhosro Tsitsishvili (died 1746), Georgian statesman, military commander, and diplomat

=== Kaikhosrov ===
- Kaikhosrov D. Irani (1922–2017), Indian philosopher

=== Kaikhosru ===
- Kaikhosru Shapurji Sorabji (1892–1988), British-Indian composer, music critic, and pianist

=== Kay Khusraw ===
- Kay Khusraw (Baduspanid ruler), Baduspanid ruler of Rustamdar

=== Kaykhosrow ===
- Kaykhosrow Khan (tofangchi-aghasi) (died 1674), Safavid-Georgian military commander and gholam
- Kaykhosrow Khan Cherkes, Safavid-Circassian gholam

=== Kaykhusraw ===
- Shah-Kaykhusraw (died 1328), ruler of the Bavand dynasty
- Kaykhusraw I (1169–1211), Seljuq Sultan of Rum
- Kaykhusraw II (1215–1246), Seljuq Sultan of Rum
- Kaykhusraw III (died 1284), Seljuq Sultan of Rum

=== Kekhashru ===
- Kekhashru Mistry (1874–1959), Indian cricketer

== See also ==
- Khosrow (disambiguation)
