= Brusa bezistan =

Museum in Sarajevo

Coordinates: 43.8589°N 18.4304°E

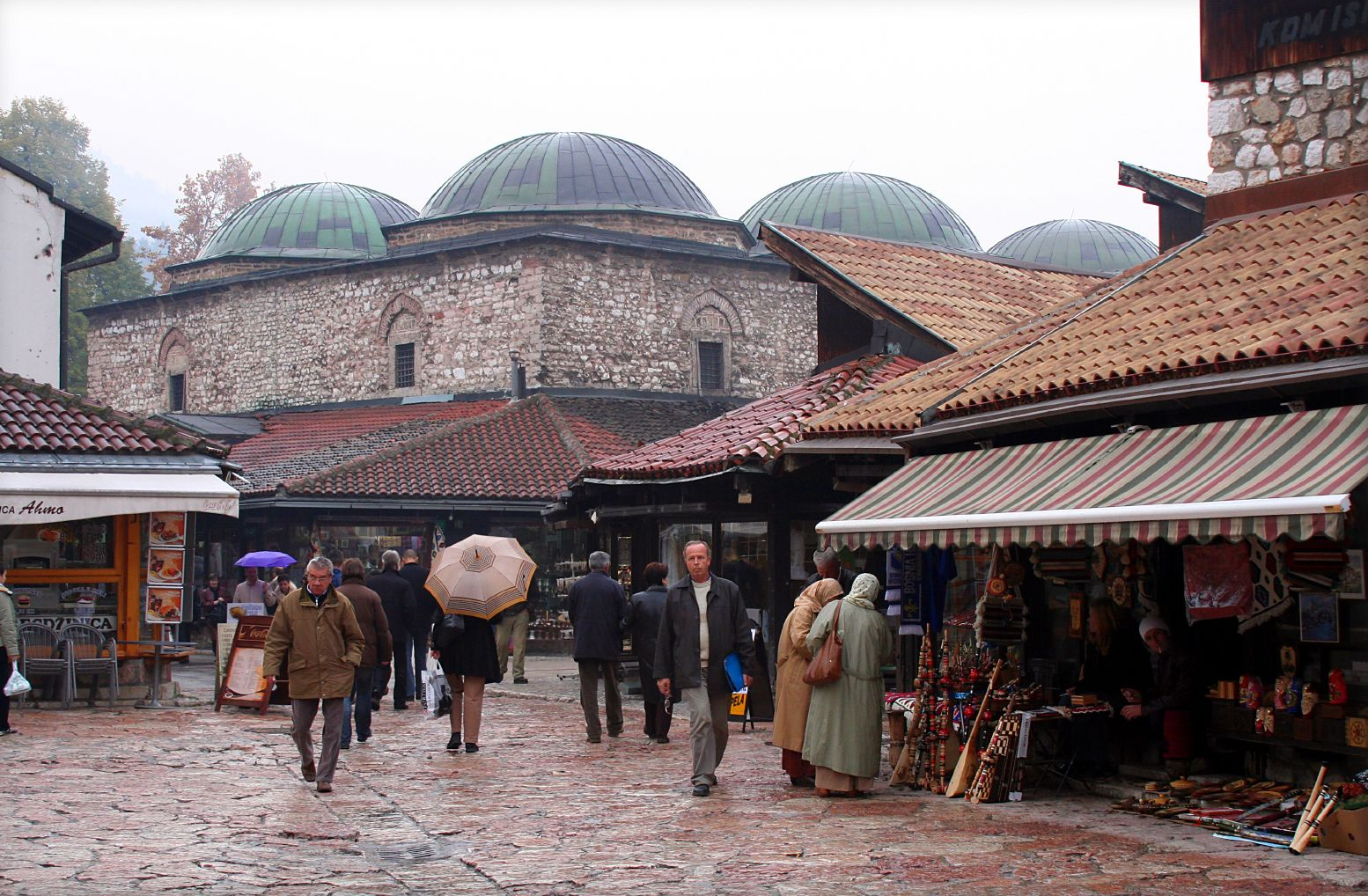
View of Brusa bezistan from center of Baščaršija

Brusa bezistan with its 6 roof domes it is one of the historic buildings in Sarajevo's Baščaršija from the time of the Ottoman period in the history of Bosnia and Herzegovina. It has a rectangular base and has four entrances on all four sides, and connects the craft streets Kundurdžiluk, Veliki and Mali Čurčiluk with Abadžiluk and the Baščaršija. It was built by order of the Grand Vizier Rustem-pasha Opuković in 1551. Bezistan was named after the Turkish city of Bursa, from which silk was brought to Bezistan and sold. Unlike Gazi Husrev-beg's bezistan, where groceries were originally sold, Brusa bezistan sold household items and small furniture in addition to silk. Today it is one of the museums in the city, designated as the National monument of Bosnia and Herzegovina by the Commission to preserve national monuments of Bosnia and Herzegovina, and houses one of the departments of Museum of Sarajevo.

== See also ==
- Gazi Husrev Bey
