= Sadavat =

- Location within Azerbaijan
- Coordinates: 40°38′N 47°34′E
- Country: Azerbaijan
- Rayon: Agdash
- Time zone: UTC+4 (AZT)
  - Summer (DST): UTC+5 (AZT)

Sadavat is a village in the Agdash Rayon of Azerbaijan. The village forms part of the municipality of Xosrov.
