= Namawar Shah Ghazi =

Namawar Shah Ghazi was the Baduspanid ruler (ustandar) of Rustamdar from 1272/3 to 1301/2. He was the son and successor of Shahragim.

An obscure ruler, he died in 1301/2 and was succeeded by his brother Kay Khusraw.

== Sources ==
- Madelung, Wilferd (1988). "Baduspanids". Encyclopædia Iranica, online edition, Vol. III, Fasc. 4. New York. pp. 385–391.

| Preceded by Shahragim | Ustandar of the Baduspanids; 1272/3–1301/2 | Succeeded by Kay Khusraw |
