= Gazi Husrev Bey's Library =

Library in Sarajevo, Bosnia and Herzegovina

Gazi Husrev-bey's Library
- Gazi Husrev-begova biblioteka

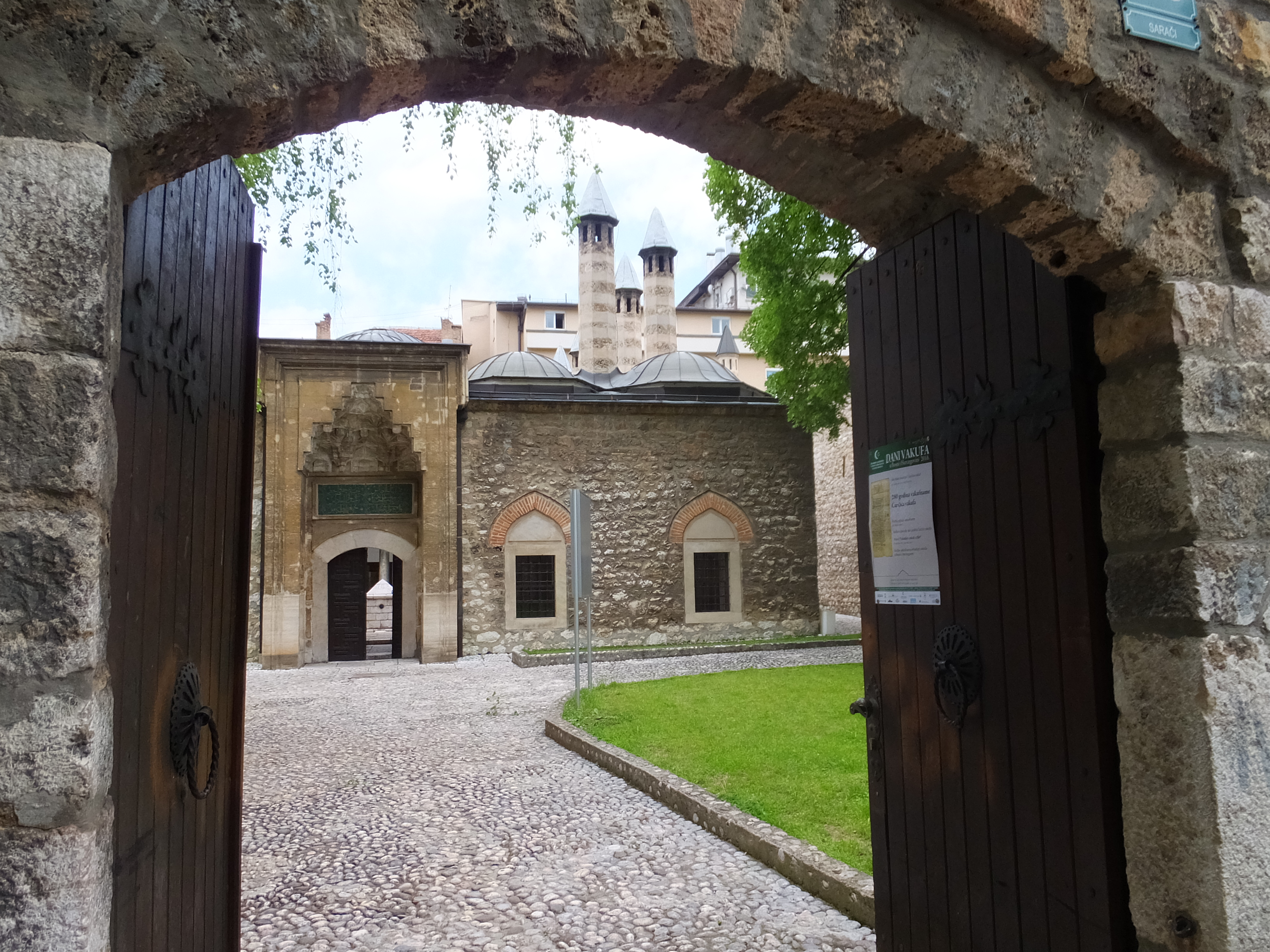
- The main gate of Gazi Husrey-bey Madrasa & Library Complex, built in 1531-37.
- 43°51′34.6″N 18°25′42.0″E
- Location: Gazi Husrev-begova 46, Baščaršija, Sarajevo, Bosnia and Herzegovina, Bosnia and Herzegovina
- Type: Public library
- Established: 1537 (489 years ago)
- Reference to legal mandate: Public libraries of Bosnia and Herzegovina

Collection
- Items collected: Fund comprises Manuscript Fund, Orientalistic Fund, Periodicals Fund, European Fund, Archives Fund, Islamic Community Fund, Photographic Fund
- Size: cca 100 000 items
- Criteria for collection: ?
- Legal deposit: ?

Access and use
- Access requirements: User must be registered before being given access to Library funds and reading rooms. The registration is made in a membership card valid for 12 months. Entry, exit, and membership identification are made at the Reception Desk of the Library. When entering a reading room, one must provide a membership card and an identification document that shall be returned to them upon exit.
- Circulation: ?
- Members: ?

Other information
- Budget: ? million € (2015)
- Director: Prof. Hilmo Neimarlija, _{chairman of the five members board}
- Employees: 29 FTE
- Website: Official website (in Bosnian and English)

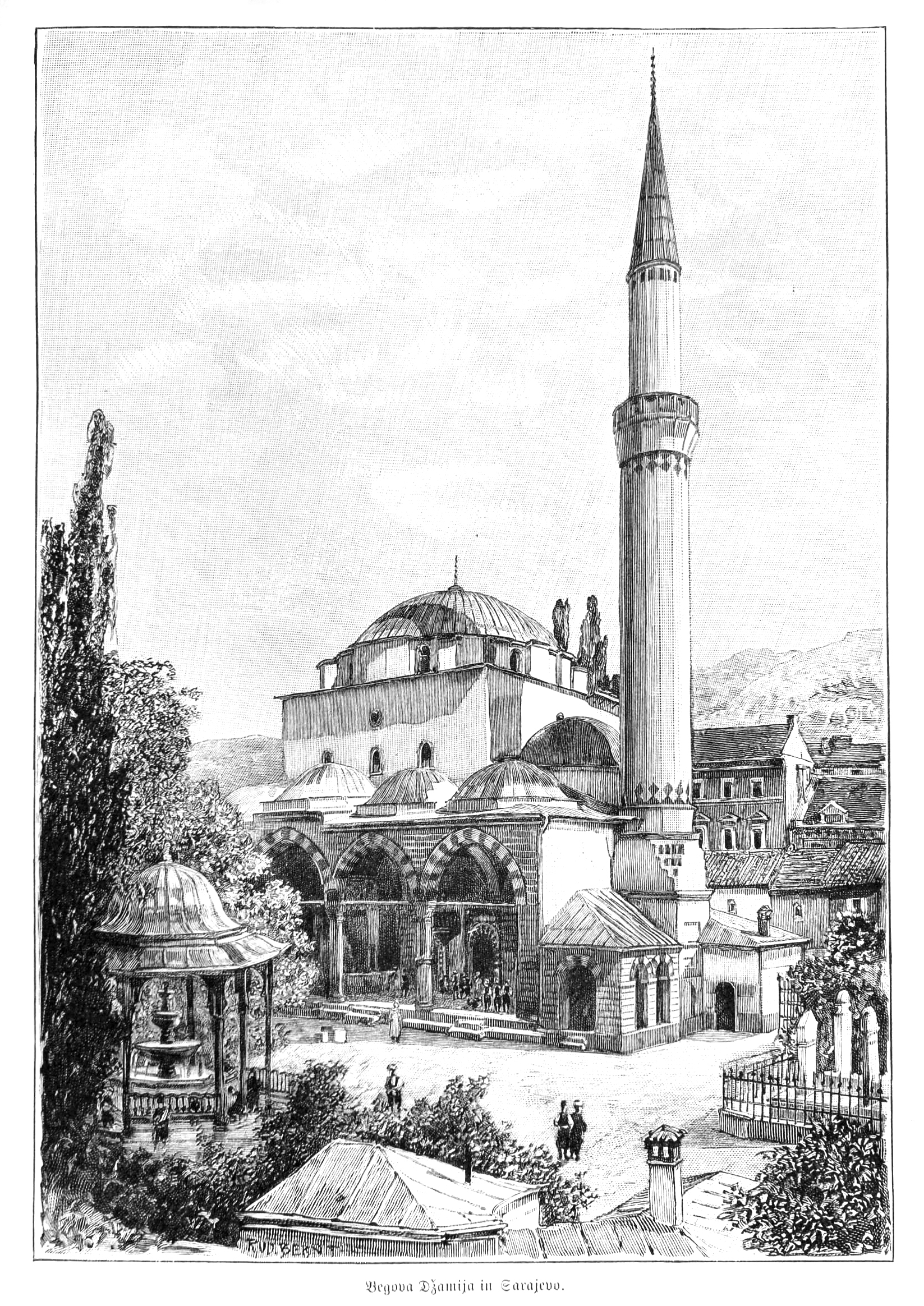
The Gazi Husrev-beg Mosque which originally housed the Library circa 1900.

The Gazi-Husrev-beg Library is a public library in Sarajevo, Bosnia and Herzegovina founded in 1537 by the sanjakbey of Bosnia Gazi Husrev-beg during Ottoman rule, it is a part of the larger complex with the Gazi Husrev-beg Medresa. It holds one of the most important collections of Islamic manuscripts in Bosnia-Herzegovina, including many originally donated by Gazi Husrev-beg. The collection survived through Bosnian war and Siege of Sarajevo. The library also holds a sizable number of books, journals, newspapers, documents and photographs.

As part of the larger complex of Gazi Husrev-begova Medresa, the library facilities are part of the National Monument designation.

== Foundation ==
In 1537, the Ottoman Empire governor of Bosnia, Gazi Husrev-beg, established a madrasa for the education of the people of the region. In the charter for its creation, the governor stipulated that "whatever money remains from the construction of the madrasa shall be used for purchasing good books, which will be used in the madrasa by readers, and for copying from them by those who engage in science."

The library and the madrasas functioned for over three hundred years as one unit until, in 1863, the library was moved to its own room, where it stayed until 1935 when it was moved to the Sarajevo Mufti’s office outside the Careva Mosque. The library continued to grow until the whole building of the former mufti's office was used for housing the library's holdings. It remained in this location until the start of the Siege of Sarajevo in 1992.

== Destruction and safekeeping ==
In 1697, an Austrian general Eugene of Savoy, raided the library, destroying many historical works. Some of the most important documents to be lost were the Sarajevo court registers, chronicling land ownership, marriages, and other important legal events.

During the Yugoslav Wars in the 1990s, much of the city of Sarajevo was under siege by forces of the Army of the Republika Srpska. Many of the printed books were moved to the Careva Mosque for safekeeping. The manuscripts were moved eight times during the nearly four-year siege of the city. The 500 most valuable manuscripts were placed inside the vaults of the Privredna Banka, where they were hidden. They remained there until the siege was lifted.

== Rebuilding ==
The Gazi-Husrev-beg Library re-opened on January 15, 2014, after 10 years of construction. The new library was built largely from a grant of US$8.8 million from the country of Qatar and has the capacity to hold nearly 500,000 items. The new library is three stories high and made of glass and marble. It has reading rooms, a conservation room and a 200-seat auditorium with WiFi headsets that allows for simultaneous translations of up to three different languages. In the basement is a museum dedicated to Bosnia's history of literacy.

== Holdings ==
The library contains over 100,000 volumes of manuscripts, printed books, and documents in Arabic, Turkish, Persian, Bosnian and other languages. More than 10,500 library units include codices of manuscripts with approximately 20,000 texts in the fields of Islamic sciences, Oriental languages, belles-lettres, philosophy, logic, history, medicine, veterinary science, mathematics, astronomy, and others.

Since the Siege of Sarajevo and the restoration of the library, several important Islamic manuscripts have been added to the library's collection. Some of the most important of these manuscripts are the following:

- The Ihya’ulum al-din is the oldest manuscript in the library and was written by Abu Hamid Muhammed al-Gazali (d. 1111) in Arabic.
- The Diwan of Hafiz Shirazi (d. 1389), written in Persian, is illuminated with Islamic miniatures.
- The Tuhfat al-ahrar is a didactic poem written by the Persian writer Nur al-Din ‘Abd al-Rahman Jami (d. 1486), and is one of the most representative pieces of Islamic calligraphy found in the collection. It was copied circa 1576.
- *Firdaws al-akhbar bi-masur al-khitab is a hadith collection copied by ‘Abd al-Salam ibn Muhammad al-Khwarizmi in 1151 in Hamadan, Iran.
- The third volume of the Qur’an commentary in Arabic, which covers the Suras Six and Seven written by Abu Ishaq Ahmad ibn Muhammad ibn Ibrahim al-Talabi al-Nisaburi (d. 1035) and copied by Barakat ibn ‘Isa ibn Abu Ya‘la Hamza in 1176.
- Several illustrations from the encyclopaedic work Ma‘rifetname, written in Turkish by Sheikh Ibrahim Haqqi al-Erzurumi (d. 1780).
- A portion of the Book Four of the al-Qanun, a famous work of medicine, written in Arabic by Ibn Sina (d. 1037).
- An Arabic commentary on Ashkal al-ta’sis fi al-handasa, a geometric treatise by Musa ibn Muhammad Qadi-zada (d. 1412), which was copied in 1675.
- The Arabic al-Mulakhkhas fi al-hay’a, a manuscript on astronomy by Mahmud ibn Muhammad ibn ‘Umar al-Jagmini al-Khawarizmi (d. 1334). This particular work was copied in 1658.

There are also significant copies of Mus'hafs, illuminated copies of the Qur'an, contained in the library's collection as well as a variety of teaching licenses from the Ottoman Empire period, and 35,000 printed books in Bosnian and other European languages.

== See also ==
- List of libraries in Bosnia and Herzegovina
