= Tašlihan =

Archaeological site in Sarajevo

Coordinates: 43.8585°N 18.4279°E

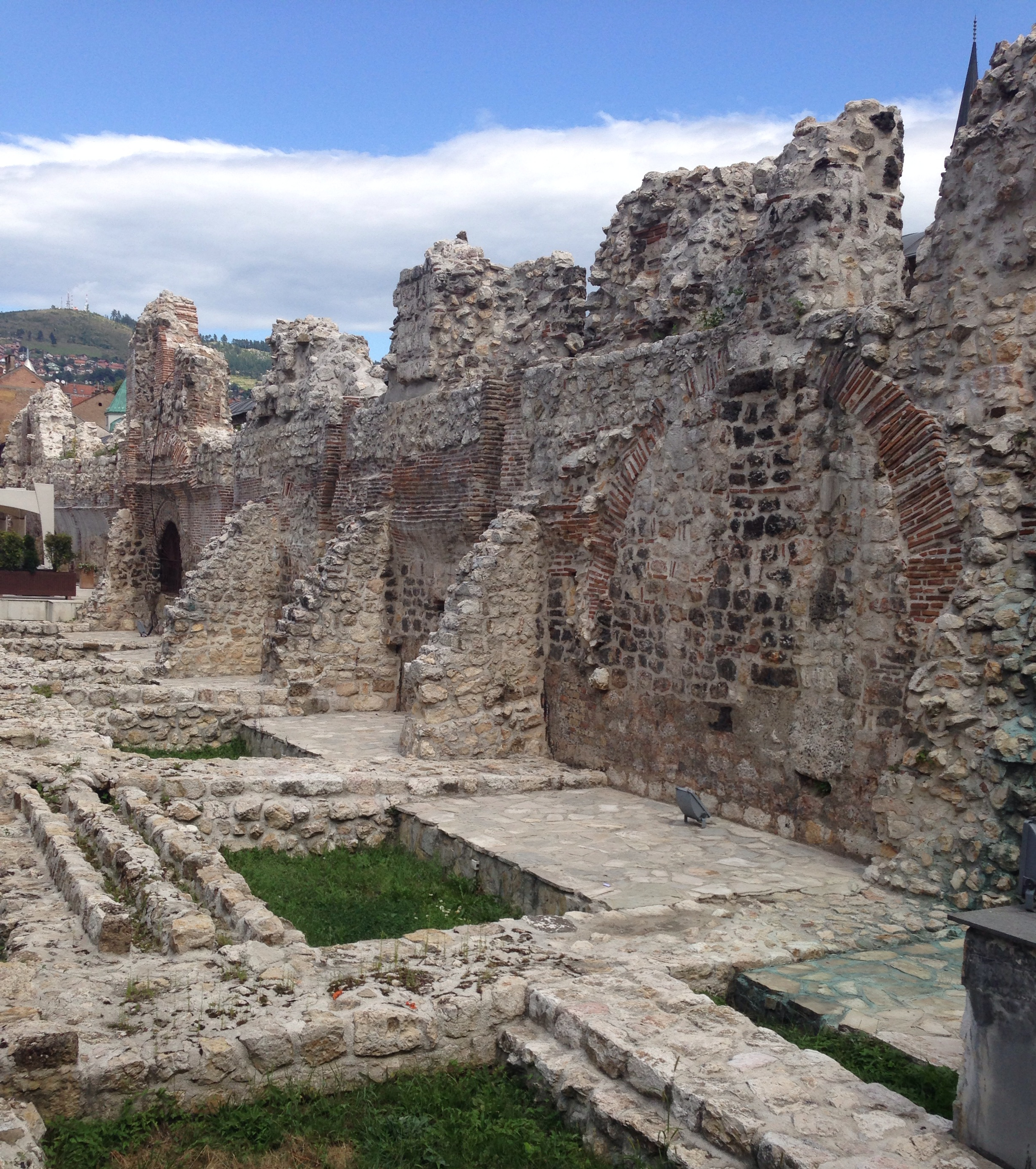
The remaining walls of Taslihan

Tašlihan or Tašli han (transl. stone inn) is a former caravanserai that was located on the site of the current summer garden and an open bar of the Hotel Evropa in Sarajevo, Bosnia and Herzegovina. It is the third stone caravanserai in Sarajevo, built in the period from 1540 to 1543, as an endowment of Gazi Husrev-beg, after his death. It was added to Gazi Husrev-beg's bezistan on its western side. It was square in shape, and its length was 47 meters. It had a fountain in its yard, on the pillars of which was a small mosque. Upstairs were the passenger rooms. Domestic and foreign merchants had their shops within Tašlihan. It is believed that this caravanserai served for trade more than for passenger traffic. The fire of 1879 severely damaged Taslihan and made it unusable.

== Archaeological site - remains of Tašlihan ==
As part of the project of rehabilitation, reconstruction and extension of the hotel "Evropa", from June 5 to July 13, 1998, archaeological excavations were carried out in the summer garden of the hotel, which resulted in the discovery of part of the foundations and massive walls of the inn.

Archaeological site - the remains of Tašlihan in Sarajevo were declared the National monument of Bosnia and Herzegovina in 2007, by the Commission to preserve national monuments of Bosnia and Herzegovina.
