= Khosrow Castle =

Castle in Ardabil Province, Iran

Khosrow castle
- قلعه خسرو

General information
- Type: Castle
- Location: Ardabil County, Iran

Khosrow castle (Persian: قلعه خسرو) is a historical castle located in Ardabil County in Ardabil Province,
