= Kay Khusraw (Baduspanid ruler) =

Kay Khusraw was the Baduspanid ruler (ustandar) of Rustamdar from 1301/2 to 1312/3. He was the brother and successor of Namawar Shah Ghazi.

Reportedly the father of almost 100 children, he was succeeded by his son Shams al-Muluk Muhammad after his death in 1312/3.

== Sources ==
- Madelung, Wilferd (1988). "Baduspanids". Encyclopædia Iranica, online edition, Vol. III, Fasc. 4. New York. pp. 385–391.

Preceded by Namawar Shah Ghazi	Ustandar of the Baduspanids; 1301/2–1312/3	Succeeded by Shams al-Muluk Muhammad
