= Khosrow Behbehani =

Professor of engineering at the University of Texas at Arlington

Khosrow Behbehani is a professor of engineering at the University of Texas at Arlington.

Behbehani earned his undergraduate degree in mechanical engineering from Louisiana State University, a master's degree in systems engineering from Georgia Institute of Technology and his doctoral degree in engineering science from the University of Toledo. He has been at the University of Texas since 1985. He was named Fellow of the Institute of Electrical and Electronics Engineers in 2013 for "contributions to development of respiratory therapy devices in chronic pulmonary diseases chronic pulmonary diseases." In 2013, after being the chair of the bioengineering department, he was appointed dean of the university's college of engineering, and served as in that position until 2016.
