= Khasruzzaman =

Khasruzzaman (Bengali: খসরুজ্জমান, lit. 'Chosroes of the Era') is a Bengali masculine given name of Perso-Arabic origin. Notable people with the name include:

- Sharif Khasruzzaman (1945–2018), politician
- Mohammad Khasruzzaman (born 1968), High Court justice
- Khasruzzaman Chowdhury (d. 2013), civil servant

== See also ==
- Khasru (disambiguation)
- Zaman (disambiguation)
