= Khosrowshahi =

Khosrowshahi (Persian: خسروشاهی) is an Iranian surname. It is derived from Khosrowshah and the Khosrowshah District, areas in the East Azerbaijan Province of northwest Iran, which were in turn named after Khusrau Shah, king of the Justanids during the 10th century. The words "Khosrow" and "Shah" are both Iranian words that mean "king".

Notable people with the surname include:

- Dara Khosrowshahi (born 1969), Iranian-American businessman
- Hassan Khosrowshahi (born 1940), Iranian-Canadian businessman
