= Xosrov =

- Municipality
- Location within Azerbaijan
- Coordinates: 40°37′32″N 47°34′46″E
- Country: Azerbaijan
- Rayon: Agdash

Population
  - Total: 1,783
- Time zone: UTC+4 (AZT)
  - Summer (DST): UTC+5 (AZT)

Xosrov (also, Khosrov) is a village and municipality in the Agdash Rayon of Azerbaijan. It has a population of 1,783. The municipality consists of the villages of Xosrov and Sadavat.
