= Khasru =

Khasru (Bengali: খসরু, also spelt Khosru) is a Bengali given name derived from the Persian name "Khusraw", having the same meaning.

- Muhammad Khasru (1946–2019), journalist and activist
- Amir Khasru Mahmud Chowdhury (born 1949), politician and government minister
- Ashraf Ali Khan Khasru (born 1949), politician
- Abdul Matin Khasru (1950–2021), lawyer and politician
- Khosru Chowdhury, politician
- Asadul Haq Khasru, politician
- Kamrul Alam Khan Khasru, freedom fighter and film actor
- Sharaf Uddin Khashru, politician
- Khasru (actor), Bangladeshi film actor

== See also ==
- Khasruzzaman (disambiguation), a derived name
