= Khosrov =

Village in Ararat, Armenia

- Location within Armenia Location within Ararat
- Coordinates: 40°01′20″N 44°54′54″E
- Country: Armenia
- Marz (Province): Ararat
- Time zone: UTC+4 ( )
  - Summer (DST): UTC+5 ( )

Khosrov is a village in the Ararat Province of Armenia.

== See also ==
- Khosrov Forest State Reserve
- Ararat Province
