= Husref Redžić =

Bosnian architect, art historian, orientalist and medievalist

- Born: 1925
- Died: 29 April 1984 (aged 64–65)
- Occupation(s): Architect, historian of architecture, Islamic and medieval art and architecture
- Employer(s): Faculty of Architecture, University of Sarajevo

Husref Redžić (1919 – 29 April 1984) was a Bosnian architect, historian of architecture, specifically Islamic and medieval art and Islamic and medieval architecture of Bosnia and Herzegovina and Yugoslavia.

== Education ==
Husref Redžić graduated from the Department of Architecture of the Faculty of Engineering, University of Belgrade, in Belgrade.

== Career ==
After finishing education, he first worked as a designer, after which he became a head of the National Design Bureau in Sarajevo, at the time a notable and the only institution of its kind in Bosnia and Herzegovina. As soon as the Faculty of Engineering, University of Sarajevo was establishment in 1949, he turned to teaching, and already in 1950, he was appointed as assistant lecturer on the History of Architecture at the Faculty's Department of Architecture, later the Faculty of Architecture, University of Sarajevo. Here he was an expert-associate and teacher at the institution for 35 years, becoming senior lecturer in 1954, and from 1960 to his death a full professor.

He worked outside the country as well, with a faculties such as ones in Rome, Paris, Brussels and Turin.

His focus was the architecture in rehabilitation and conservation of historic buildings and cultural and historical heritage, putting emphasis on training architects in respect to preserving architectural heritage. He noted that the greatest threat to this heritage comes from architects and town planners themselves, because of untrained and inappropriate use of procedures and inadequate knowledge.

== Legacy ==
Redžić was a reputable expert in his field in Bosnia and Herzegovina and Yugoslavia and abroad. He was an editor-in-chief of the Faculty's Proceedings, a head of the Department of Architecture of the Faculty of Engineering, later the Faculty of Architecture, University of Sarajevo. He held a Chair of the History of Art and Architecture and the Revitalization of the Built Heritage. He was a dean and a member of the Faculty's board and of the University of Sarajevo.

Redžić advocated the idea of bringing architecture closer to ordinary citizens through the media, but that a good working relationship must first be established between architects and the media in order to draw the attention of journalists to their mistakes in writing about architecture and its trends and norms, especially concerning conservation and preservation.

The Husref Redžić Award is an annual award given by the Faculty of Architecture, University of Sarajevo.

== Selected works ==
- Istorija arhitekture: stari vijek, Zavod za izdavanje udžbenika, Sarajevo, 1969
- Studije o islamskoj arhitektonskoj baštini, "Veselin Masleša" publishing, Sarajevo, 1983
- Islamic art, "Jugoslavija", Beograd, 1967
- Srednjovjekovni gradovi u Bosni i Hercegovini, Sarajevo Publishing, Sarajevo, 2009
- Neka iskustva obrazovanja arhitekata za revitalizaciju arhitektonske baštine, Beograd, 1980
- Srednjovjekovni utvrđeni gradovi u Bosni i Hercegovini: naučnoistraživački projekat, Institut za arhitekturu i urbanizam Arhitektonsko-urbanističkog fakulteta, Sarajevo, 1975
- Istorija književnosti i umjetnosti Arapa, Turaka i Perzijanaca : naučnoistraživački projekat, Orijentalni institut, Sarajevo, 1979
- Stanovanje u srednjovjekovnim utvrđenim gradovima Sokocu, Bilaju i Komotinu : naučnoistraživački projekat, Institut za arhitekturu i urbanizam Arhitektonsko-urbanističkog fakulteta, Sarajevo, 1975
- Per la conservazione della Moschea di Gazi Husrev-Beg a Sarajevo, Quaderni dell'Istituto di Storia dell'Architettura / Università degli Studi di Roma La Sapienza, Dipartimento di Storia dell'Architettura, Restauro e Conservazione dei Beni Architettonici, 1987
- Le monument historique, son ambiance et son utilisation actuelle, Monumento per l'uomo, Padova, 1972
- Neka iskustva revitalizacije starih gradskih jezgara u Bosni i Hercegovini : quelques expériences de renouvellement des vieux noyaux des villes en Bosnie et Herzegovine, Zbornik zaštite spomenika kulture / Jugoslovenski Institut za Zaštitu Spomenika Kulture, 1975
