= Gazi Husrev-begov bezistan =

Coordinates: 43.8586°N 18.4279°E

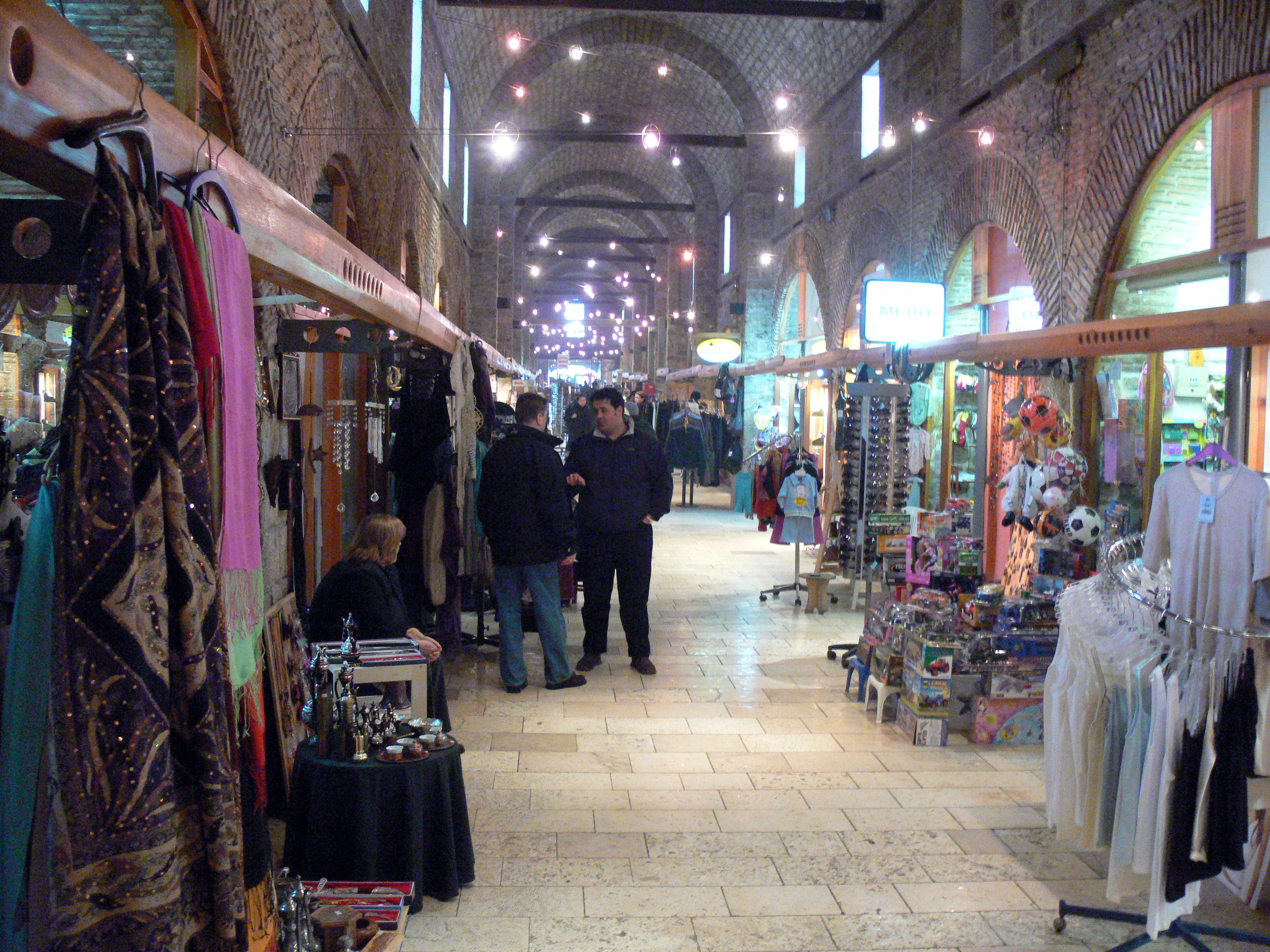
The interior of the bezistan.

Gazi Husrev-beg's bezistan is one of the preserved bezistan in Sarajevo, Bosnia and Herzegovina, from the Ottoman period in the history of the country. Built in 1555 in Baščaršija, bezistan still serves its purpose - trade.

== History ==
Bezistan is part of the endowment of Gazi Husrev-beg. It was built in 1555 in the immediate vicinity of the Kuršumli Madrasa, the Bey's Mosque and the Clock Tower, with which it is connected by an eastern entrance. It is rectangular in shape with entrances, which border the 109 m long street in which small shops are located. Gazi Husrev-beg Street (also called Zlatarska) runs parallel along the bezistan. Dubrovnik craftsmen took part in the construction. Due to the slightly lower temperature achieved by building below the level of the surrounding streets, the original purpose of the bezistan was to trade in groceries. This still makes shopping on warm, summer days enjoyable. With its appearance, Gazi Husrev-beg's bezistan is reminiscent of the Kapali Bazaar and bezistan in Istanbul or souk in the cities to the east.

== National Monument ==
Gazi Husrev-beg's bezistan has been declared a national monument of Bosnia and Herzegovina. The decision was taken by the Commission to Preserve National Monuments at its session held from 4 to 11 September 2006, composed of: Zeynep Ahunbay, Amra Hadžimuhamedović (chair), Dubravko Lovrenović, Ljiljana Ševo and Tina Wik.

In addition to the bezistan, there was also the Tashlihan, which was built at the same time as the bezistan, also as the waqf of Gazi Husrev-beg. It suffered great damage in the fire of 1879, and the last walls of the Taslihan disappeared in 1912.

== Gallery ==
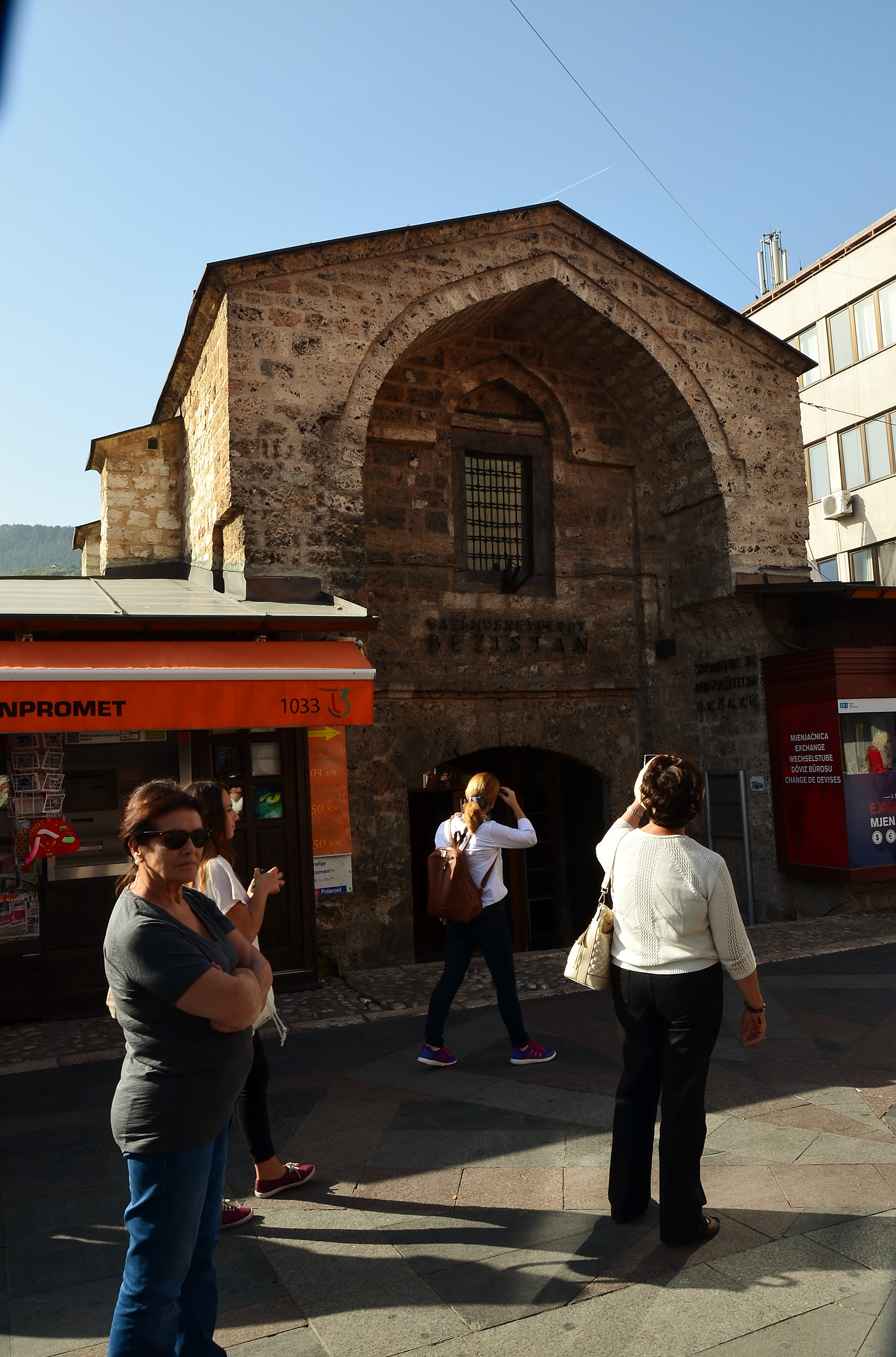

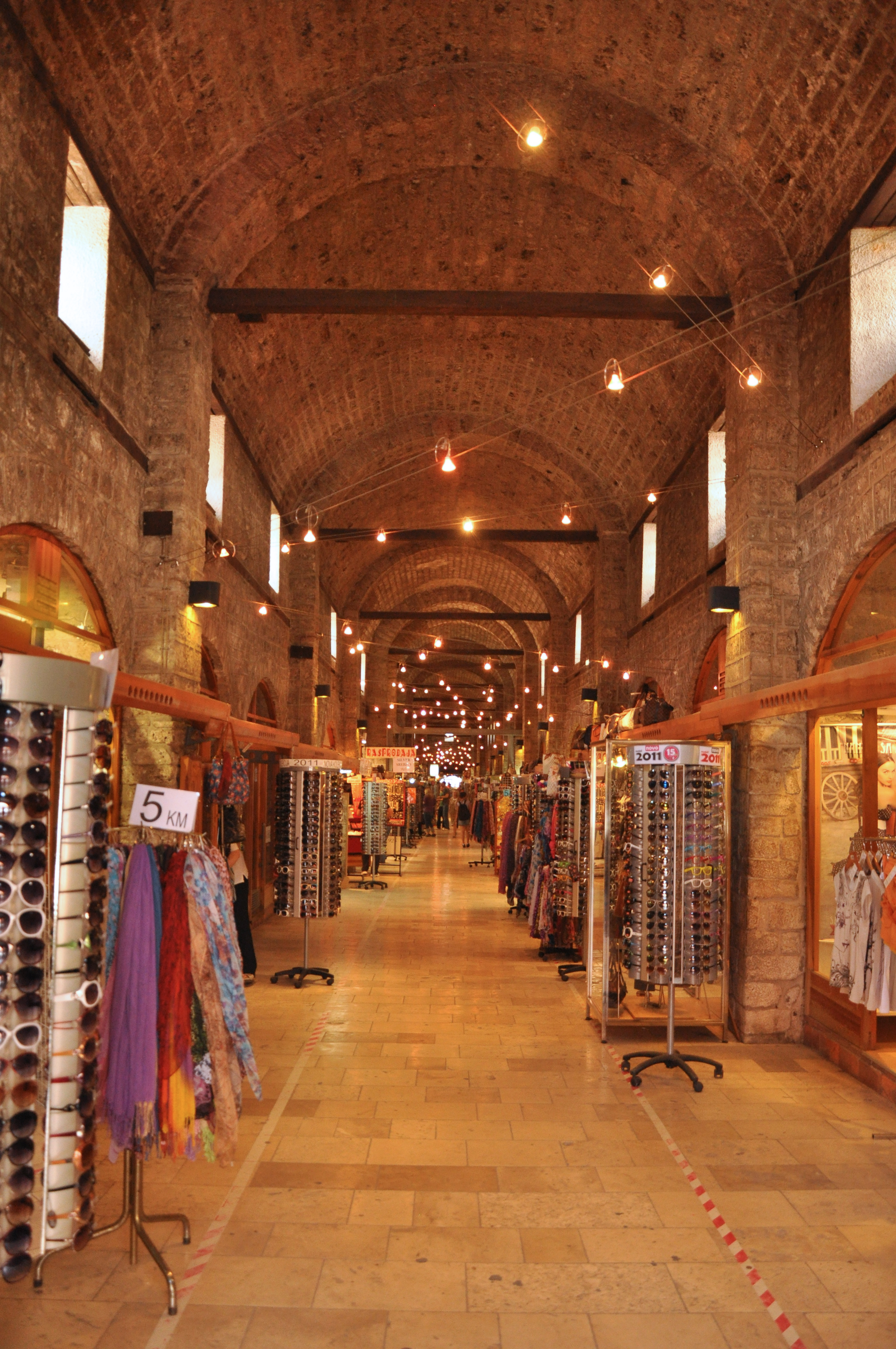

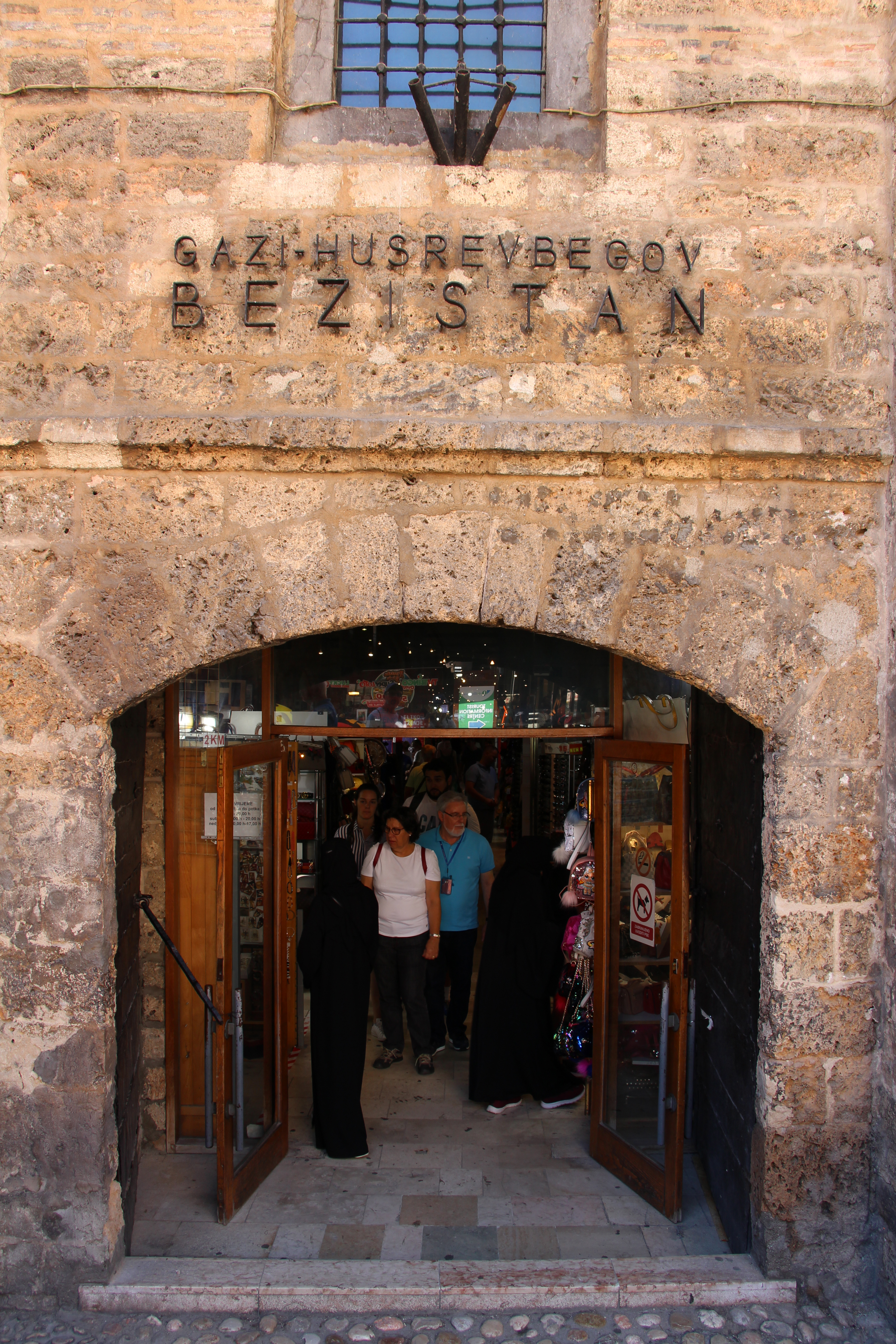

== Literature ==
- Ahmed Mehmedović, Gazi Husrev-beg i njegove zadužbine, Sarajevo 2005.
- Behija Zlatar, Zlatni period Sarajeva: Prilozi historiji Sarajeva, Institut za istoriju, 1997.
- Alija Bejtić, Ulice i trgovi starog Sarajeva, Sarajevo 1973.
