= Gazi Husrev Bey's Madrasa =

JU Gazi Husrev-begova medresa
- Gazi Husrev-begova medresa

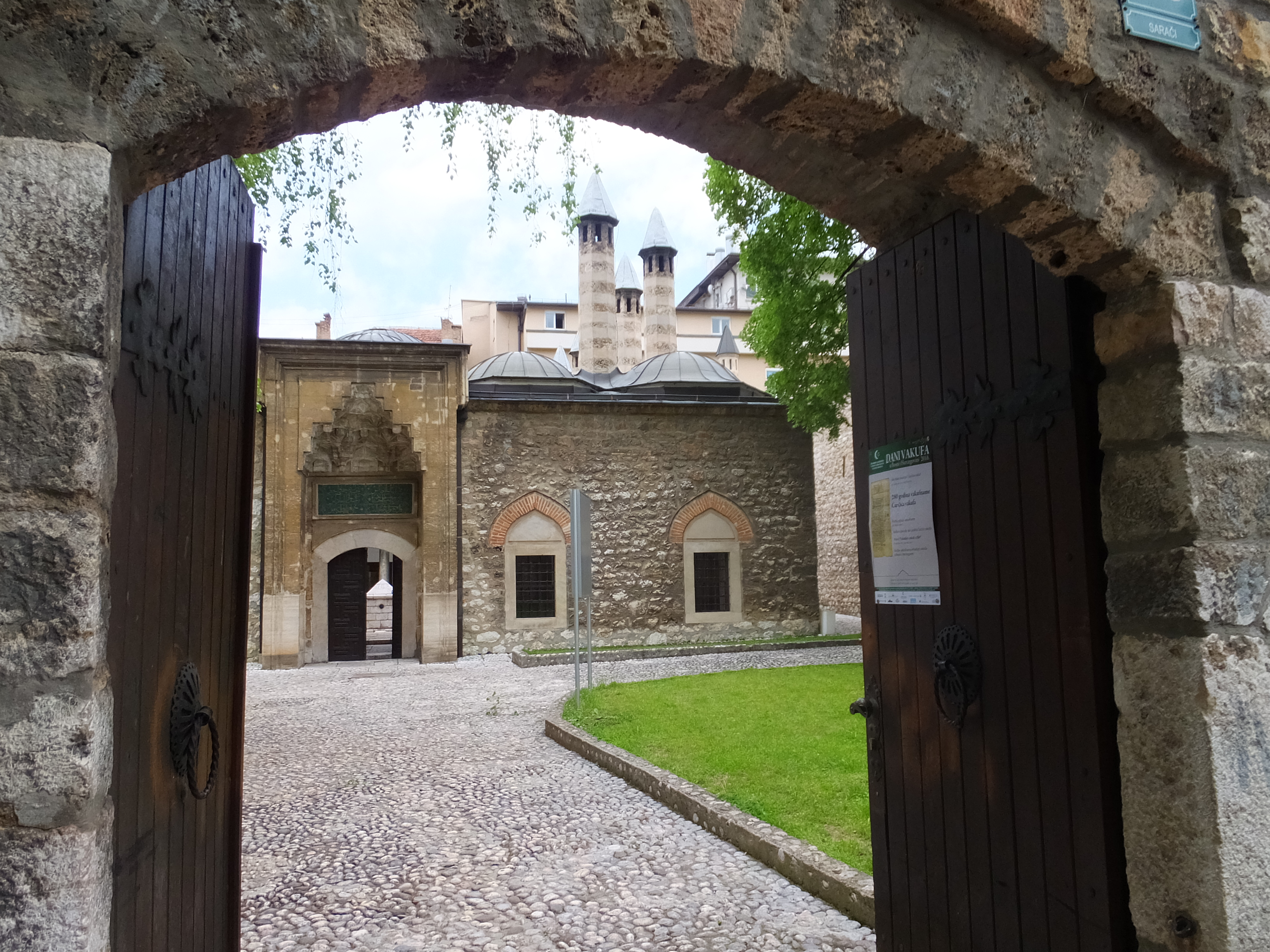
- Gazi Husrev-beg Complex, old & new buildings, school, library & dorm

Location
- Sarači 49; Baščaršija, Sarajevo; Sarajevo, Sarajevo Canton 71000; Bosnia and Herzegovina
- Coordinates: 43°51′34.6″N 18°25′42.0″E

Information
- Other name: Kuršumlija medresa
- Type: Public institution
- Religious affiliation: Islam
- Denomination: Sunni
- Founded: 8 January 1537; 486 years ago
- Founder: Gazi Husrev-beg
- Status: Active
- Sister school: Behram-begova medresa, Tuzla; Elči Ibrahim-pašina medresa, Travnik; Karađoz-begova medresa, Mostar; Medresa “Gazi Isa-beg”, Novi Pazar; Medresa “Osman-ef. Redžović”, Veliko Čajno, Visoko; Medresa ”Reis Džemaludin-ef. Čaušević”, Cazin; Medresa “Reis Ibrahim-ef. Maglajlić”, Banja Luka
- School board: Ramiza Smajić, Ministry of Education, Science and Youth of Sarajevo Canton
- Educational authority: Ministry of Education, Science and Youth of Sarajevo Canton
- Representatives: Ramiza Smajić; Maid-ef. Ibrahimović; Mensur Kerla
- Specialist: Sabaheta Ahmetagić
- President of board: Munir Mujić
- Administrator: Benaris Šehić
- Director of madrasa: Mensur Malkić
- Teaching staff: 37
- Secondary years taught: 9th - 14th
- Gender: both
- Age range: 14-18
- Language: Bosnian
- Campus type: urban, enclosed
- Endowment: vakufnama 1537
- Information: https://medresasa.edu.ba/

JU Gazi Husrev-begova medresa, Sarajevo (Javna ustanova Gazi Husrev-begova medresa u Sarajevu; transl. The Gazi Husrev-beg Public Institution and Madrasa in Sarajevo) is a high school and college, a madrasa in Arabic, founded on 8 January 1537 CE and built in Sarajevo as Gazi Husrev-beg's second endowment. It was built in the style of the Istanbul madrasas, and was called Kuršumlija because it was covered with a lead roof (lead in Turkish: kurşun).

== History ==
At the Gazi Husrev-beg madrasa classes were attended and the teaching methods and schedules were traditional, modeled on other madrasas of large cities throughout the Ottoman Empire.

In his will (waqf name), Gazi Husrev-beg appointed a professor (muderris) and his madrasa to be a learned man (alim), who would teach the interpretation of the Qur'an (tefsir), oral tradition (hadit), legal philosophy and its topics, such as sharia law (ahkam) and Islamic Islamic jurisprudence (fiqh), sharia law institutions. (usul), philosophy and its topics, such as poetics and rhetoric concerning semantic syntax, and allegorical and non-allegorical significations, linguistic allusion and linguistic signalling (al-Maānī wa 'l-Bayān), metaphysical dogmatics (kalam), "and of other sciences, those that require habit and time".

The education lasted between 12 and 16 years, the students were not divided into classes but into rings (circles, groups), and at the end of school they received a diploma (ijazah).

== Reorganization ==
The madrasa has been reformed several times. and until the country's disintegration, it was a five-year Muslim high school.

In 1978, the women's department of the Gazi Husrev-beg Madrasa was established for the first time. The old building of Kuršumlija has been partially restored and is preserved as a cultural monument under state protection.

== Gazi Husrev-beg madrasa today ==
Today, the Gazi Husrev-beg Madrasa acts as a high school and college. The training lasts for four years. Classes are conducted in Bosnian according to the Curriculum adopted by the Islamic Community in Bosnia and Herzegovina (Rijaset), and approved by the Ministry of Education and Science of Sarajevo Canton. Students who have completed this high school can continue their education at any faculty in Bosnia and Herzegovina and at many faculties abroad.

The madrasa is a boarding school and all regular students live there. This, in addition to regular classes, allows them a variety of extracurricular activities through different sections, clubs and circles. The choir section, which has a dozen recorded audio and video features with Islamic religious songs glorifying Allah (ilahija) and songs about famous people from the Islamic milieu (kasida).

=== Zemzem publication ===
The Zemzem newspaper, which has been published continuously since 1968. The name is a reference to a water well known as Zamzam, and situated within the Masjid al-Haram in Mecca.

== National monument ==
Old Kuršumlija madrasa, and facilities built during Ottoman period in the history of Bosnia and Herzegovina, are designated National Monument of Bosnia and Herzegovina by the Commission to preserve national monuments of Bosnia and Herzegovina.

== Gazi-Husrev-beg Library ==
The Gazi Husrev-beg Library is a public library founded in 1537, and is part of a larger complex with Gazi Husrev-beg Medresa. It holds one of the most important collections of Islamic manuscripts in Bosnia-Herzegovina, including many originally donated by Gazi Husrev-beg. The collection survived through Bosnian war and Siege of Sarajevo. The library also holds a sizable number of books, journals, newspapers, documents and photographs. The library is part of the National Monument designation.

== See also ==
- Vijećnica
- Gazi Husrev-beg's endowment

== Bibliography ==
- Bećirbegović, Madžida (1970). "Prosvjetni objekti islamske arhitekture u Bosni i Hercegovini". Prilozi Za Orijentalnu Filologiju. Sarajevo: Orijentalni institut: 223–364. 104008455 1126062052 4965670 16399874
- Bejtić, Alija (1953). "Spomenici osmanlijske arhitekture u Bosni i Hercegovini". Prilozi Za Orijentalnu Filologiju I Istoriju Jugoslovenskih Naroda Pod Turskom Vladavinom. Sarajevo: Orijentalni institut: 229–297. 89151498 103969543 1126062052 16399874
