= Turkish Cooperation and Coordination Agency =

Turkish governmental department

- Türk İşbirliği ve Koordinasyon Ajansı

Agency overview
- Formed: 1992
- Headquarters: Ankara, Turkey
- Employees: 760
- Annual budget: 2.612.491.000 TL (2024)
- Agency executives: Serkan Kayalar, President; Naci Yorulmaz, Vice President
- Parent department: Ministry of Culture and Tourism (Turkey)
- Website: tika.gov.tr/en/

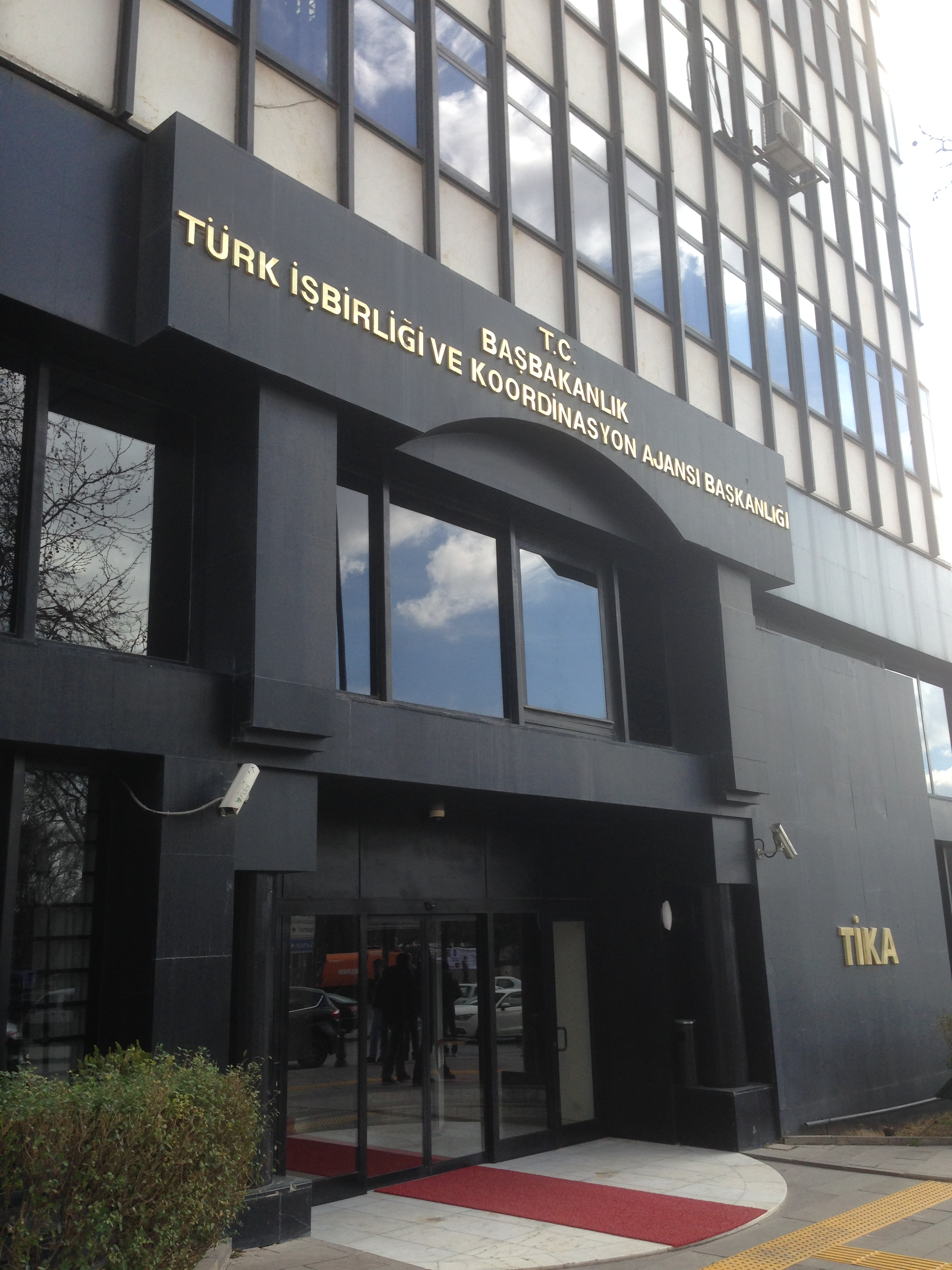
Turkish International Cooperation and Development Agency Building in Ankara.

The Turkish Cooperation and Coordination Agency (Turkish: Türk İşbirliği ve Koordinasyon İdaresi Başkanlığı, TİKA) is a government department subordinate to the Ministry of Culture and Tourism (Turkey). Focusing on development cooperation, TİKA works in more than 150 countries. It also goes by the name Turkish International Cooperation and Development Agency. TİKA is responsible for the organization of the bulk of Turkey's official development assistance to developing countries, with a particular focus on Turkic and African countries and communities. According to the OECD, 2020 official development assistance from Turkey increased by 1.2% to US$8 billion. As of January 2022, TİKA has undertaken 30,000 projects worldwide.

== Mission ==
TIKA's objectives can be summarized as;

- Assist in the development of Turkic countries and communities.
- Develop economic, commercial, technical, social, cultural and educational cooperation among Turkic countries and communities.
- Engage in social and cultural projects and activities aimed at preserving common cultural, social heritage and values among Turkic countries and communities.
- Provide scholarships and assistance to public officials and other individuals from such countries for education and training in Turkey.
- Provide technical assistance and humanitarian aid.
- Act as the main facilitator for cooperation among Turkic state institutions and organisations, universities, non-profit organisations and the private sector
- Cooperate with other International aid agencies through various project and programmes.

== History ==
With the dissolution of the USSR in 1991, Turkic countries in Central Asia gained their independence (Azerbaijan, Kazakhstan, Kyrgyzstan, Turkmenistan, and Uzbekistan). This paved the way for the resurgence of dual relations between Turkey and these countries. Sharing a common language, history, culture and ethnicity with these countries, developing these relations has been a permanent focus for Turkey. There was a need to establish an organization in order to fund, develop and coordinate activities and projects in a variety of different fields. The Turkish Cooperation and Development Agency (TCCA) in 1992 was established for this purpose.

=== Early years 1992–2000 ===
TCCA Program Coordination offices were set up in Azerbaijan, Kazakhstan, Kyrgyzstan, Turkmenistan, and Uzbekistan. Numerous projects in the fields of education, agriculture, industry and finance were undertaken. The main focus in these early years was on educational and social projects in Central Asia such as the construction of schools, universities, libraries and providing scholarships to students and public officials to study in Turkey.

=== Expansion 2000–2010 ===
In this era, TCCA was developed to become an integral part of Turkish Foreign Policy. Its activity area was enlarged to encompass the Middle East, Africa and the Balkans. The number of programme coordination offices more than doubled from 12 offices in 2002 to 28 in 2010. Over time, TCCA's focus began to shift from direct aid provision to technical assistance, institutional capacity building and human development activities, and other types of work were added to its responsibilities, like leading heritage restoration projects. More than 100 projects were implemented in 25 countries in 2010.

By the end of the decade, the destination of the majority of aid and assistance had shifted from Turkic countries to Africa. During this decade, development aid provided by Turkey reached US$1.273 billion.

=== 2010-2019 ===
During this period, activities have been expanded into Latin America as well as the wider Asian region. In 2014 year in the framework of the partnership of TCCA TATIP Turkey-Azerbaijan-Tanzania Cooperation Health Program, Doctors of the World association and Azerbaijan volunteer doctors, Doctors of the World association, Azerbaijan volunteer doctors and The Fund of Aid for Youth (Azerbaijan) as well as with the assistance of doctors Bahruz Guliyev, Imran Jarullazada, Qoshqar Mammadov and within the support of Tanzania REHEMA Foundation realized cataract surgery of more than 100 Tanzanian patients and more than 100 patients underwent eye examinations. As of 2015, TIKA has programme coordination offices in 42 countries.

Top aid destinations have been Tunisia, Somalia, Afghanistan, Chad, North Macedonia and Kyrgyzstan.

Activities and projects in 2015 included

- Training of 522 doctors, nurses and midwives in Azerbaijan to combat infant mortality
- Provision of simultaneous translation equipment to an academy in Kazakhstan
- The refurbishment of the Tashkent Turkish Elementary School in Uzbekistan
- Provision of necessary medical staff and resources for the reconstructive plastic surgery of 580 patients in Uzbekistan
- Renovation of the Ottoman-built Aladža Mosque (1550) and Ferhadija Mosque (1579) in Bosnia and Herzegovina
- Refurbishment of the Motrat Qiriazi school in Prizren, Kosovo
- Refurbishment of the Mustafa Kemal Atatürk School in Macedonia
- Provision of medical equipment and medicines to the Gaza Strip
- Provision of a clean water supply system to the Chatanga village in Gabon
- Refurbishment of a safe house for women fleeing abuse in Yaoundé, Cameroon
- Reconstruction and refurbishment of a 7000-capacity high school in Mazar-i-Sharif, Afghanistan
- Construction of a 185-capacity school in Kampong Cham Province, Cambodia
- Reconstruction and refurbishment of a school in Khövsgöl Province, Mongolia
- Provision of 40 computers for the Mustafa Kemal Atatürk High School in Santiago, Chile
- Training for the police forces of numerous countries including Azerbaijan, Kazakhstan, Kyrgyzstan, Tajikistan, Turkmenistan, Uzbekistan, Mongolia and Tunisia
- Training medical staff in The Gambia.

=== After 2020 ===
TCCA has supported many countries fight against COVID-19, such as Palestine, & Uganda.

In South Africa, in April 2020, TCCA supported Kalafong Hospital in Pretoria with 10,000 N95 face masks to be used by frontline health workers to curb the spread of COVID-19

TCCA also provided protective gear in Lesotho to help the Southern African Kingdom curb the outbreak of the COVID-19 pandemic. The donated equipment was used in hospitals and clinics by medical staff and by community health workers in the remote rural areas of Lesotho.

In order to reduce the impact of the COVID-19 pandemic in the Kingdom of Eswatini, TCCA assisted the Ministry of Tinkhundla Administration by donating embroidery machines to be used in the production of face masks.

In 2021, TCCA renovated the Duisi Mosque in Georgia which was originally built in 1901.
