= Aladža Mosque =

Mosque in Foča, Bosnia and Herzegovina

- Aladža džamija
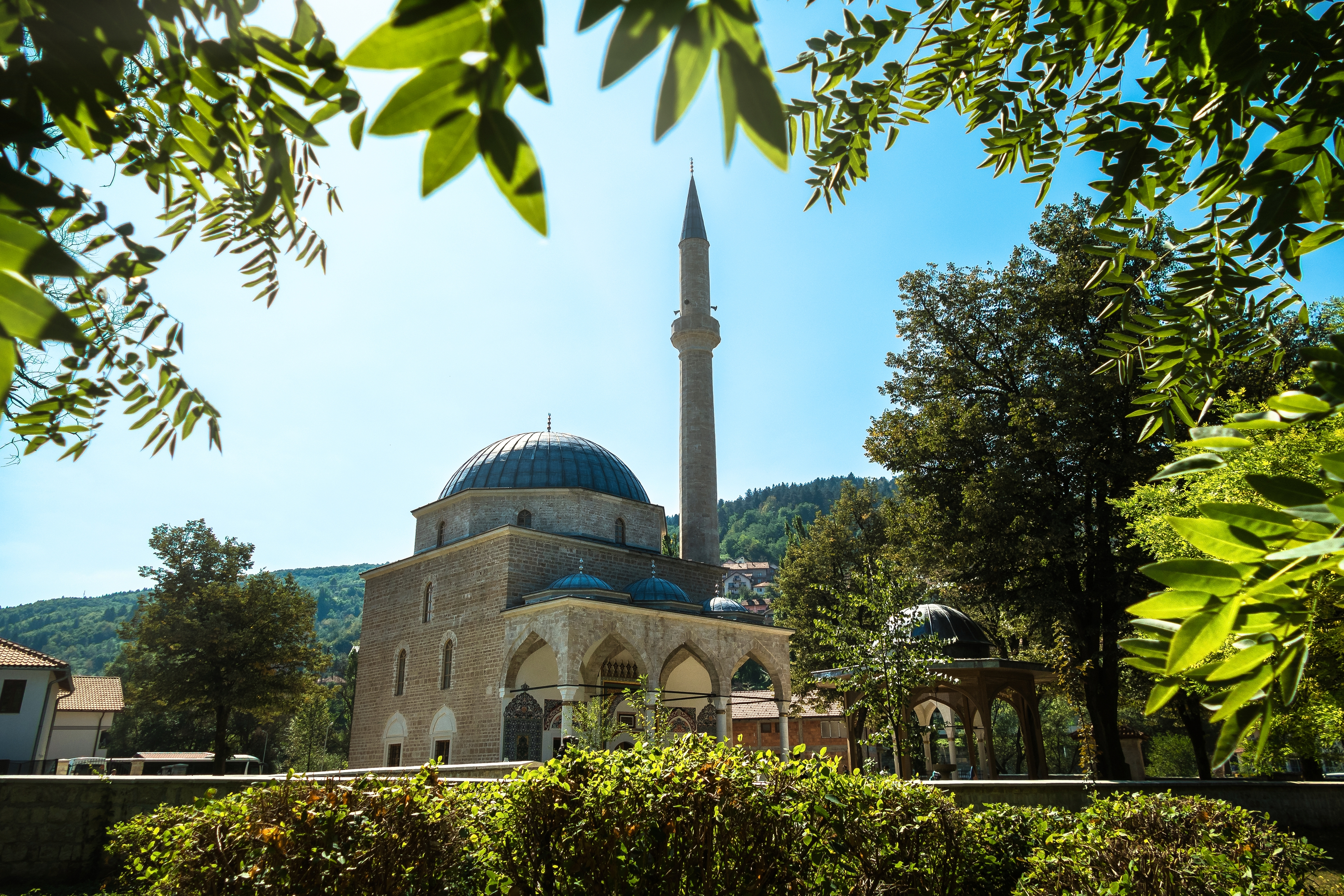

- Location of the mosque in Bosnia and Herzegovina

Religion
- Affiliation: Sunni Islam
- Ecclesiastical or organizational status: Mosque: (1549–1992); (since 2018– )
- Status: Active

Location
- Location: Foča, Republika Srpska
- Country: Bosnia and Herzegovina
- Interactive map of Aladža Mosque
- Coordinates: 43°30′20″N 18°46′47″E

Architecture
- Architect: Ramadan-aga
- Type: Mosque
- Style: Ottoman
- Completed: 1549 CE (original); 2018 (rebuilt)
- Destroyed: 2 August 1992 (during the Bosnian War)

Specifications
- Dome: 1
- Dome height (outer): 19.85 m (65.1 ft)
- Dome dia. (outer): 11 m (36 ft)
- Minaret: 1
- Minaret height: 36 m (118 ft)

The Aladža Mosque (Bosnian: Aladža džamija; Turkish: Alaca Camii), also known as the "Colorful Mosque" (Šarena džamija), is a mosque located in Foča, in the Republika Srpska political division of Bosnia and Herzegovina. Built in 1549 CE, during the Ottoman era, the mosque is considered one of the most beautiful and important examples of Ottoman architecture in Europe and, along with the Gazi Husrev-beg Mosque in Sarajevo and the Ferhadija Mosque in Banja Luka, it is one of the most important Ottoman-era mosques in Bosnia and Herzegovina.

The mosque was completely destroyed by the VRS with pre-planted explosives at the beginning of the Bosnian War in 1992, and levelled to the ground; along with the left over stones and rubble from the mosque being hidden all over Foča to prevent its reconstruction. After many years of searching for the stones once the Bosniak refugees of Foča began to return, and sourcing the funds necessary for the reconstruction of the mosque, its reconstruction was started in 2016, and was completed in 2018.

== History ==
=== Establishment ===
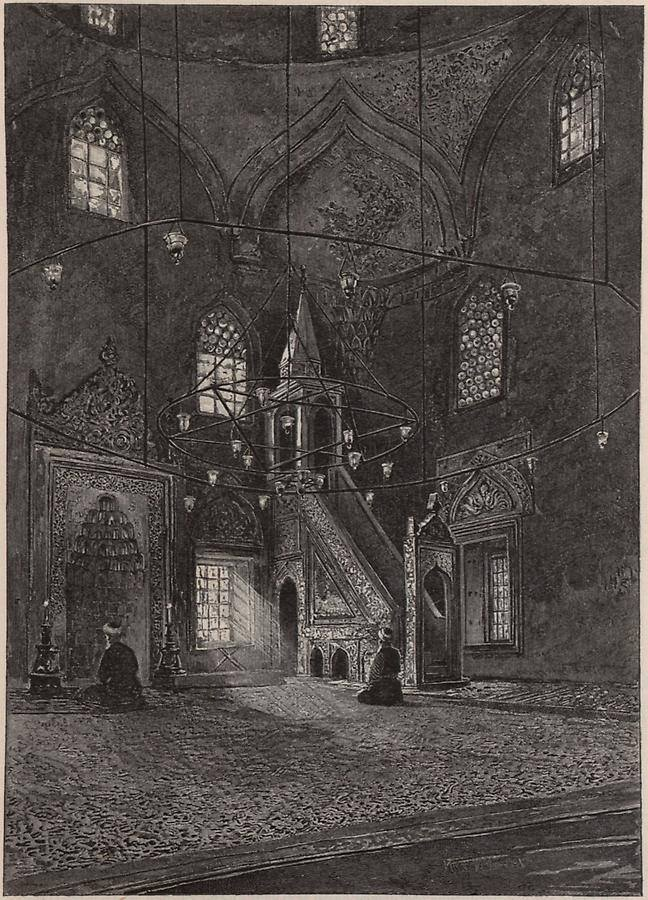
Interior of the Aladža Mosque in Foča illustrated by Hugo Charlemont. In: The Austro-Hungarian Monarchy in Word and Picture (Die österreichisch-ungarische Monarchie in Wort und Bild - "Kronprinzenwerk"), Vol. 22: Bosnia and Herzegovina. Vienna 1901, p. 421.

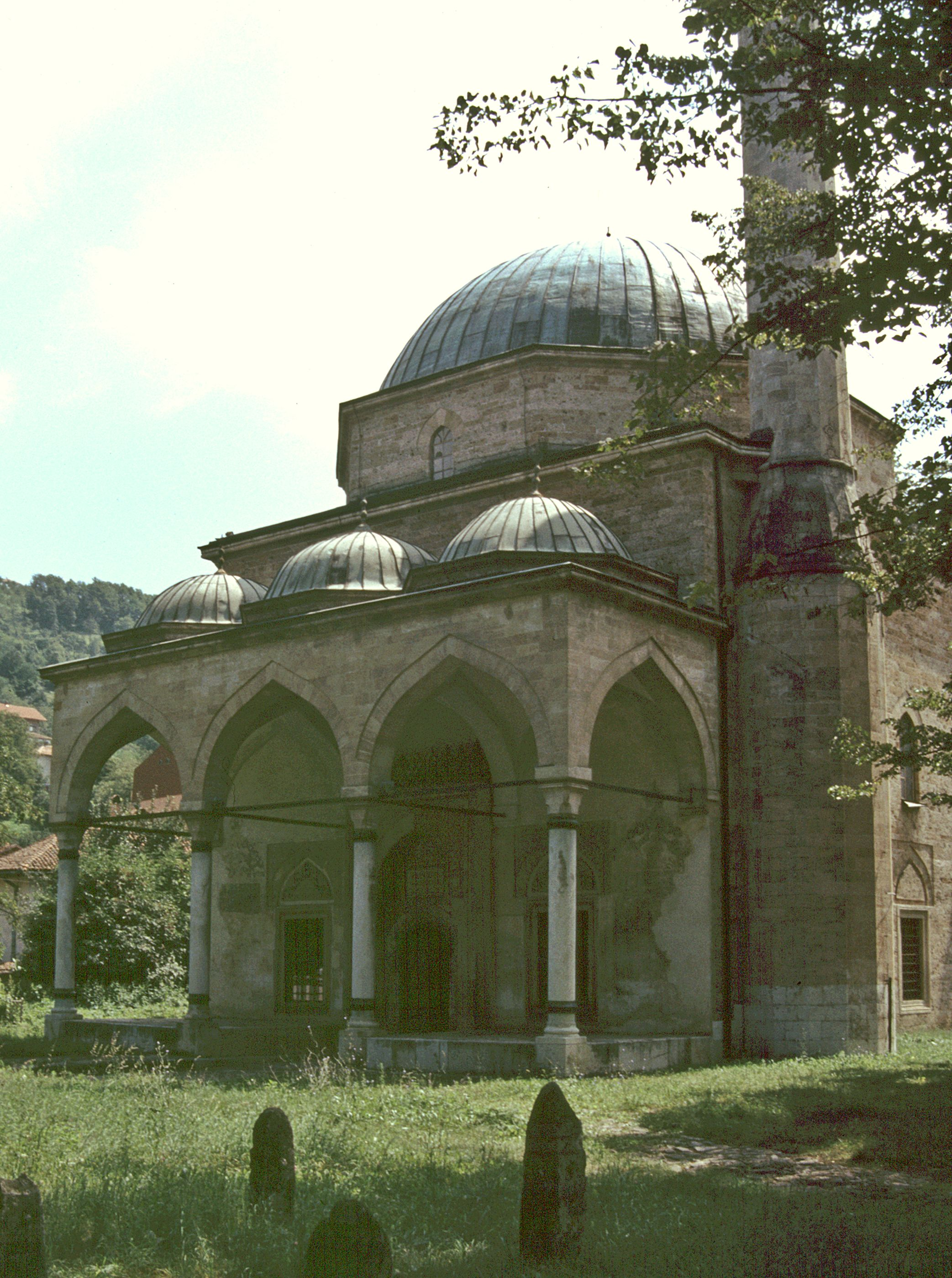
Exterior of the Aladža Mosque photographed in August 1989. During the Bosnian War, all of the mosques in Foča were destroyed by the Army of Republika Srpska.

The mosque was erected in 1549 by Hasan Nezir, the Ottoman Persian supervisor of state goods and finance in Bosnia and a close associate of Mimar Sinan. The master builder was Ramadan-aga, who was trained in the Persian culture and Persian architecture. It was decorated with beautiful colours, so it was named Aladža, "the Colourful".

The mosque, a masterpiece of Ottoman architecture, is more than 37 metres (120 ft) high and has harmonious lines, marble columns, portal, cubes, corners and chasers. The ornamentation is in typical Ottoman classical architectural style, and since it was the first mosque of its kind in Bosnia and Herzegovina, its design was emulated by many others that were later built. This is one of the reasons why the Yugoslav authorities put it under state protection in 1950.

=== Destruction ===
During the Ottoman period, seventeen mosques were built in Foča; five were destroyed during World War II and twelve were destroyed during the War in Bosnia and Herzegovina. From April to June 1992, all mosques were demolished in Foča.

The mosque was blown up on 22 April 1992 by the Army of Republika Srpska and then completely demolished on 2 August 1992. Its remains were removed to the city's landfills. The area on which the mosque stood has been fenced and remained empty for the following 22 years. The first fragments of Aladža were found in 2004, along with the remains of the bodies of killed Bosniaks, in the rubble around 200 metres (660 ft) south of the iron bridge over the Drina and around 300 metres (980 ft) north of this bridge.

In October 2018, the Bosnian State Court charged Goran Mojović for crimes against humanity, including the destruction of the Aladža Mosque. According to the prosecutor, in the course of a widespread and systematic attack by the Bosnian Serb military, paramilitary and police forces against the civilian population of the city of Foča, on the evening of 2 August 1992, Mojović, as head of the local engineering unit of the Army of Republika Srpska, gave the order to destroy the mosque, and - despite the refusal of two other soldiers - together with Rajko Milošević detonated the mosque with about 25 anti-tank mines. Mojović and Milošević were charged for having violated international law on the protection of civilian and cultural property.

=== Reconstruction ===
The reconstruction of the mosque in line with the original plans was carried out between 2014 and 2018 under supervision of the Commission to preserve national monuments of Bosnia and Herzegovina. It was financed by the Turkish Cooperation and Coordination Agency (TIKA). The restored Aladža Mosque was opened on 4 May 2019 by Aziza Kurtović, a woman who lost her son during the war.

In the early morning of 18 February 2021, several gunshots were fired against the mosque's minaret which suffered minor damage.

== Architecture ==
Like the Ali Pasha Mosque and the Gazi Husrev-beg Mosque, both in Sarajevo, and the Sinan-beg Mosque in Čajniče, the mosque was built along the “classical” Ottoman style.

The floor plan was almost square, 11.2 by 11.3 metres (36.8 by 37 ft). The dome, which had a diameter of 7.9 metres (26 ft), rose above an octagonal drum. The height to the apex of the dome was 19.85 metres (65.12 ft). There were five windows in each of the three sides of the mosque, and in front of the front there was a vestibule with pointed arched arches supported by four marble columns and three domes. The minaret was 36 metres (118 ft) high. Inside the mihrab, minbar and muezzin mahfili there was an Islamic stone sculpture, which was considered the most beautiful in the Balkans (Trifunović). The mosque had picture decorations, including a rosette on the north wall with floral decoration and wall painting in the lobby.

== Gallery ==
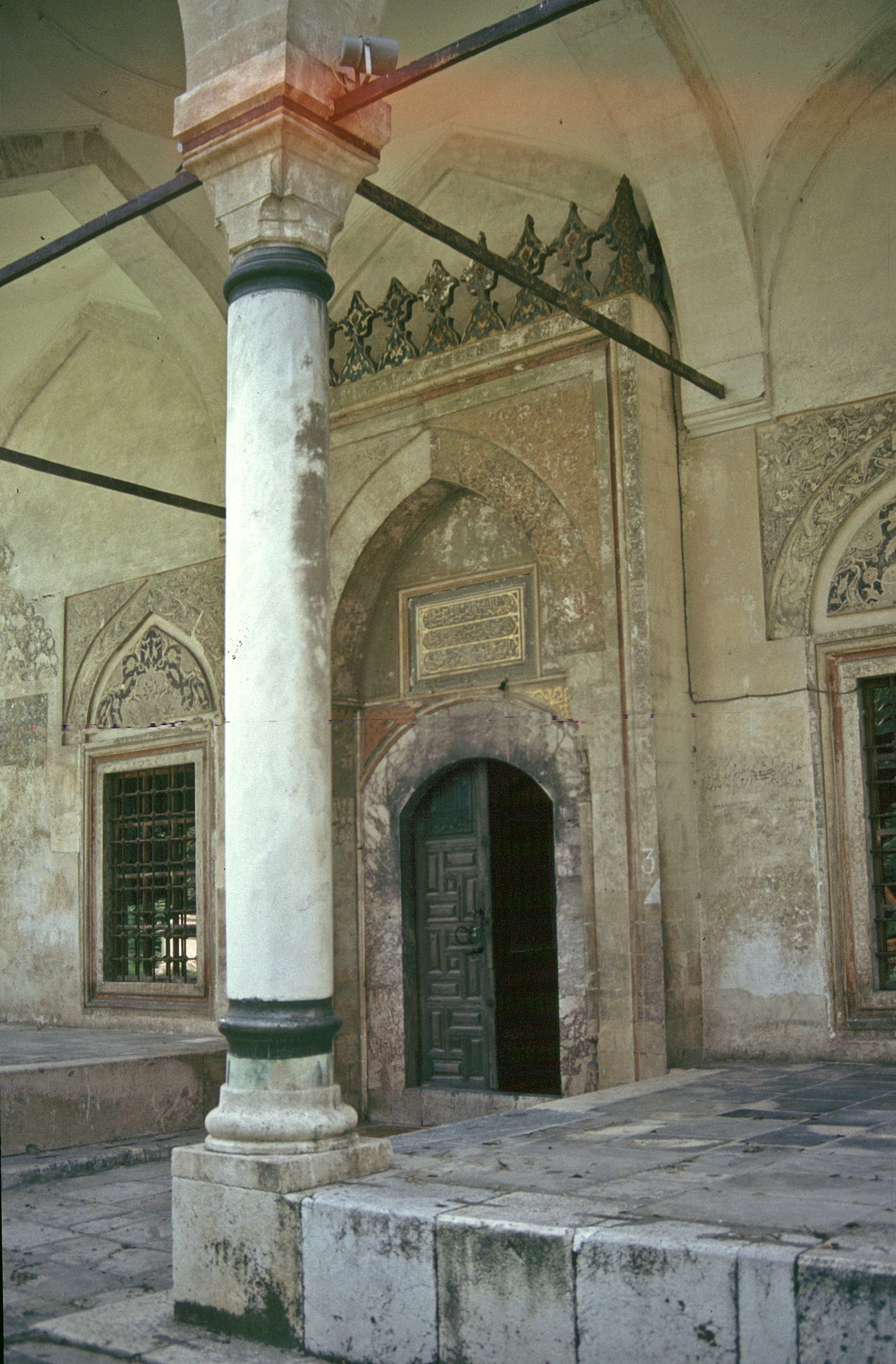
Entrance to the old mosque, 1989

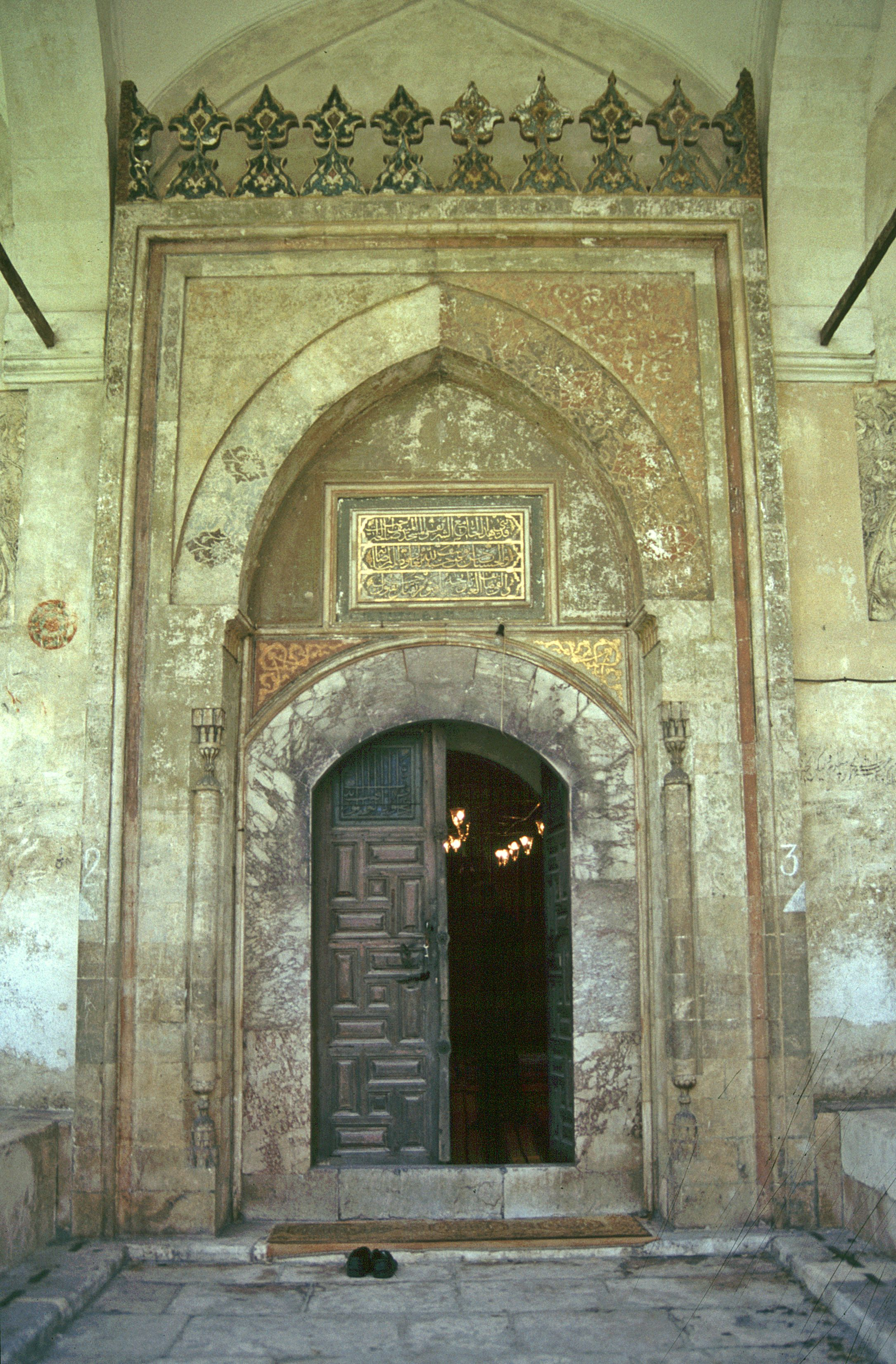
Entrance to the old mosque, 1989

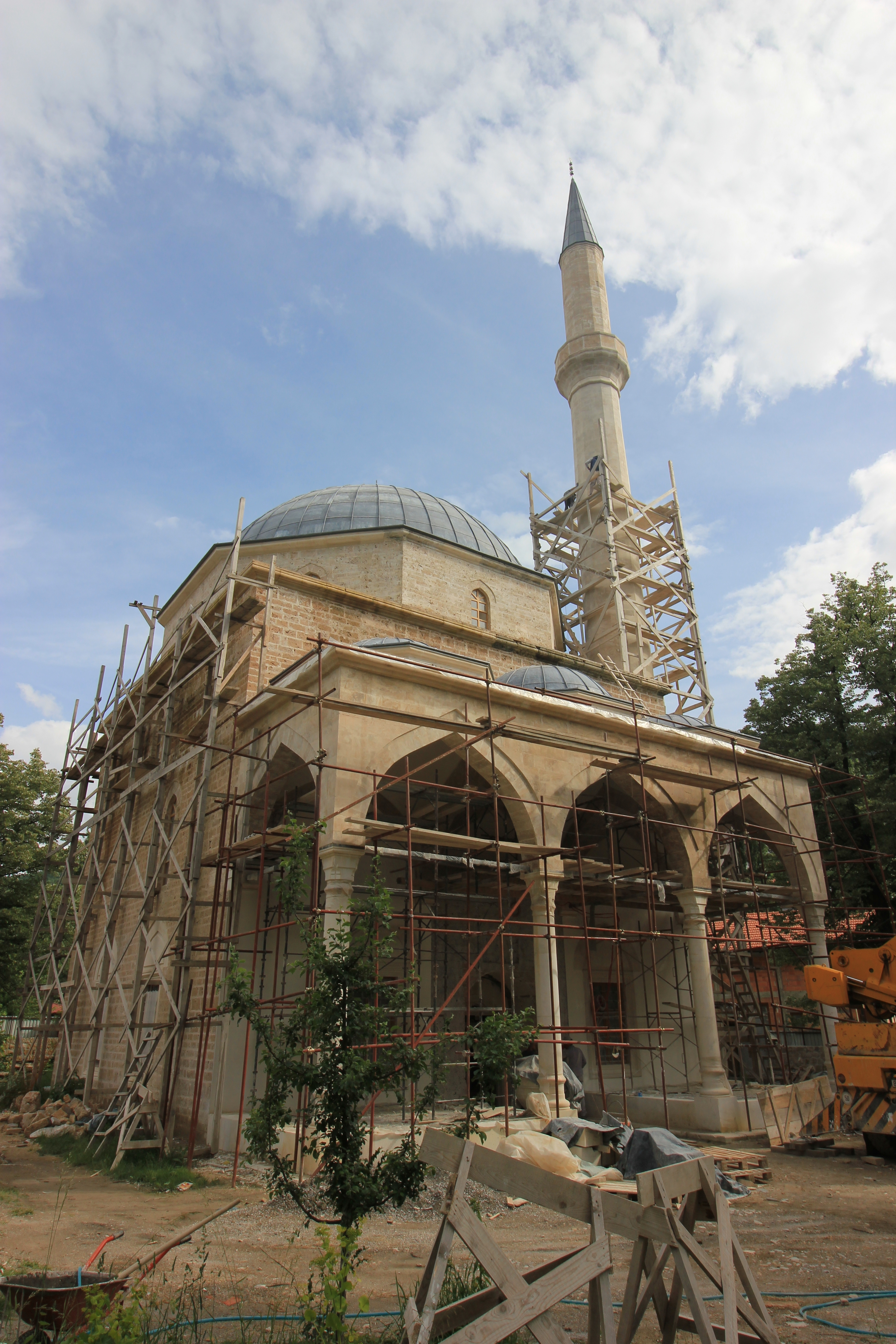
The mosque during reconstruction

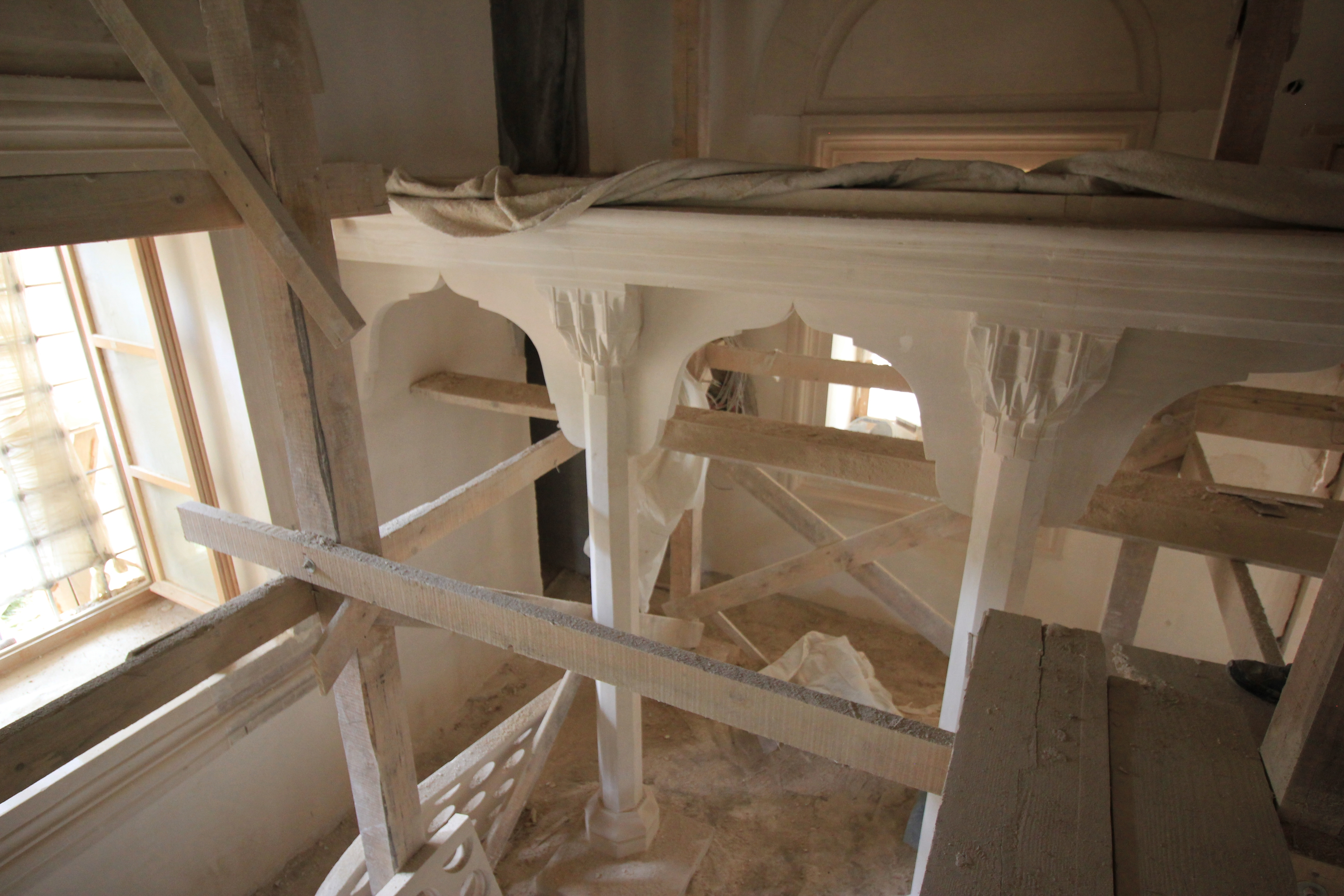
Interior of the mosque during reconstruction

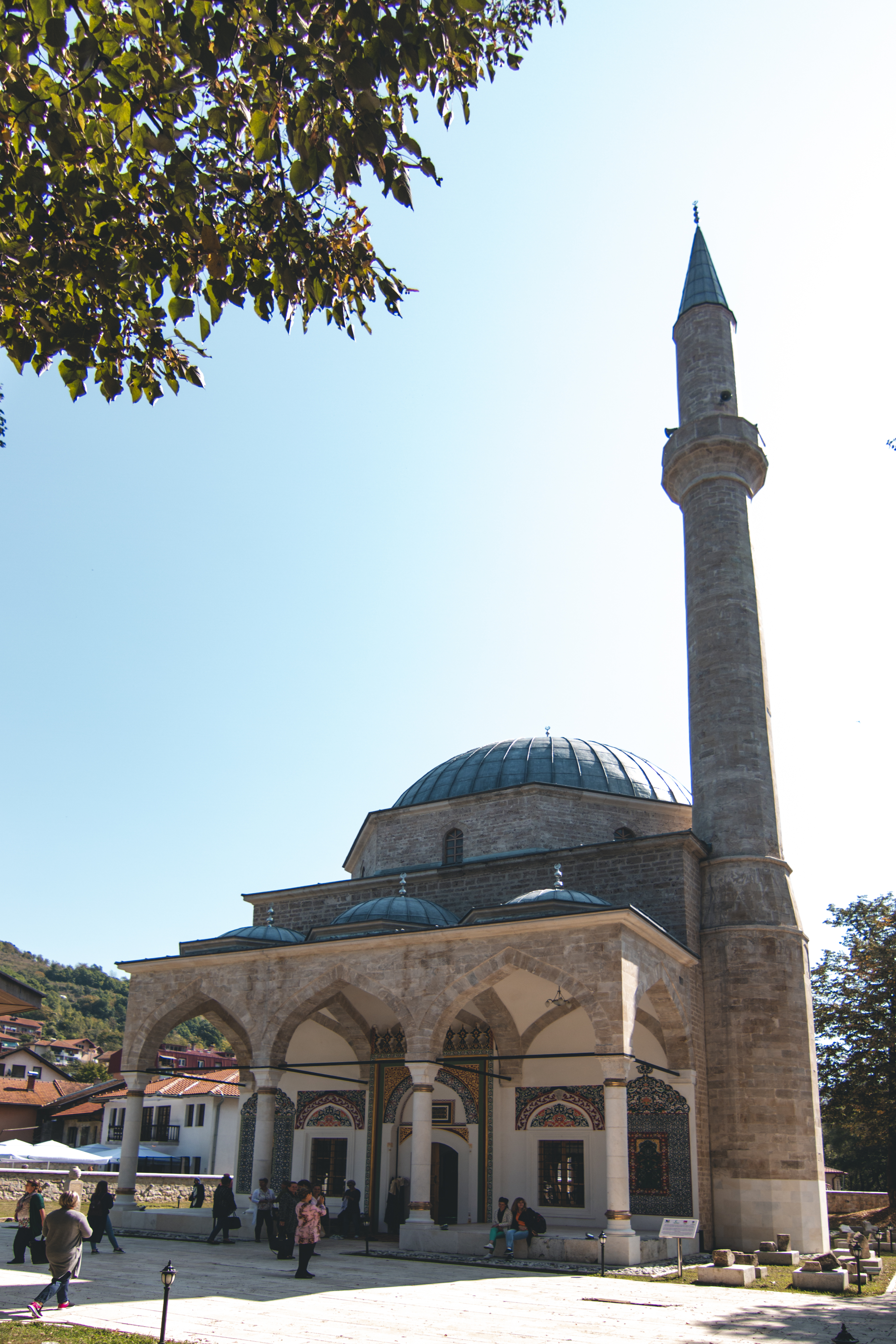
The rebuilt mosque

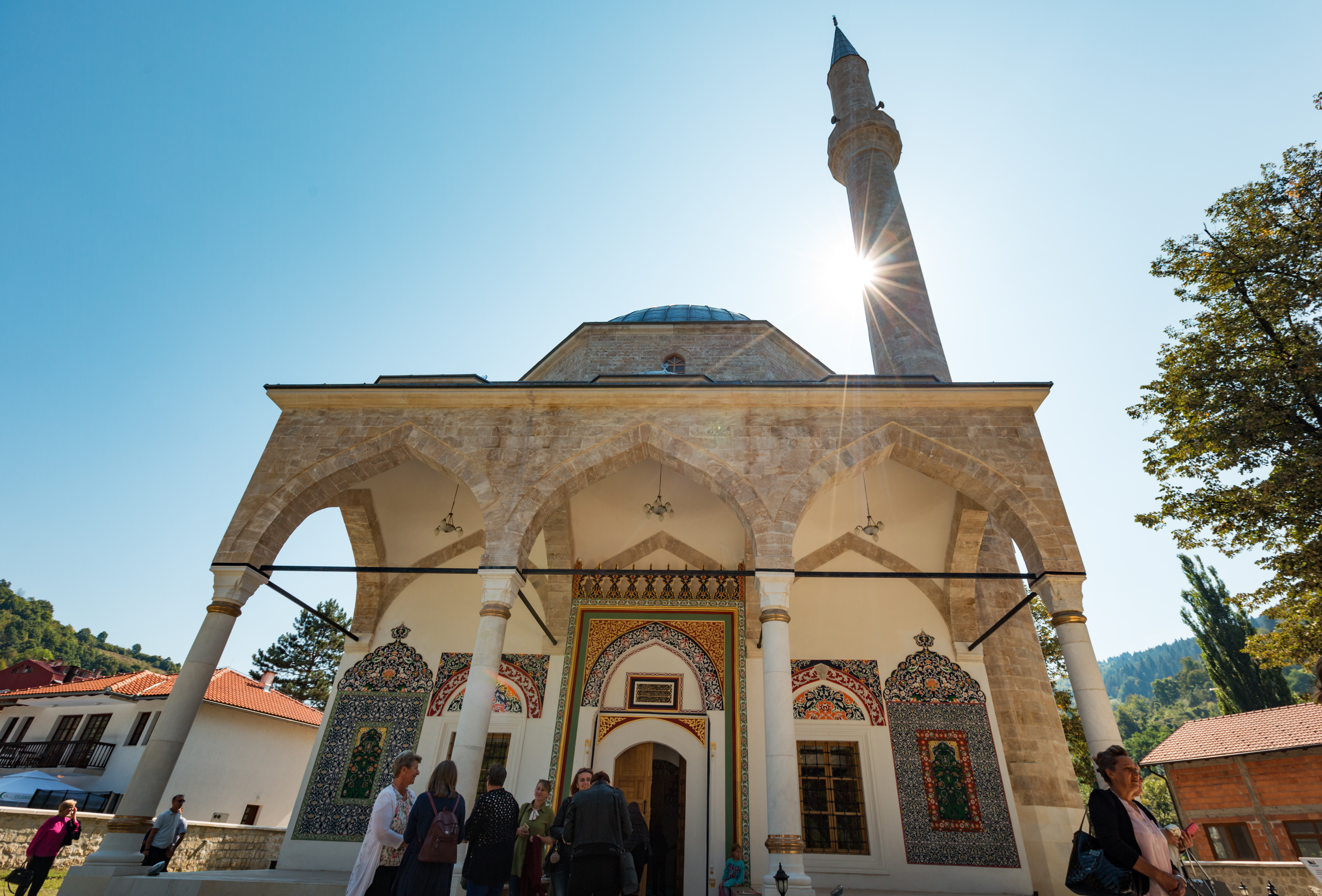
The rebuilt mosque

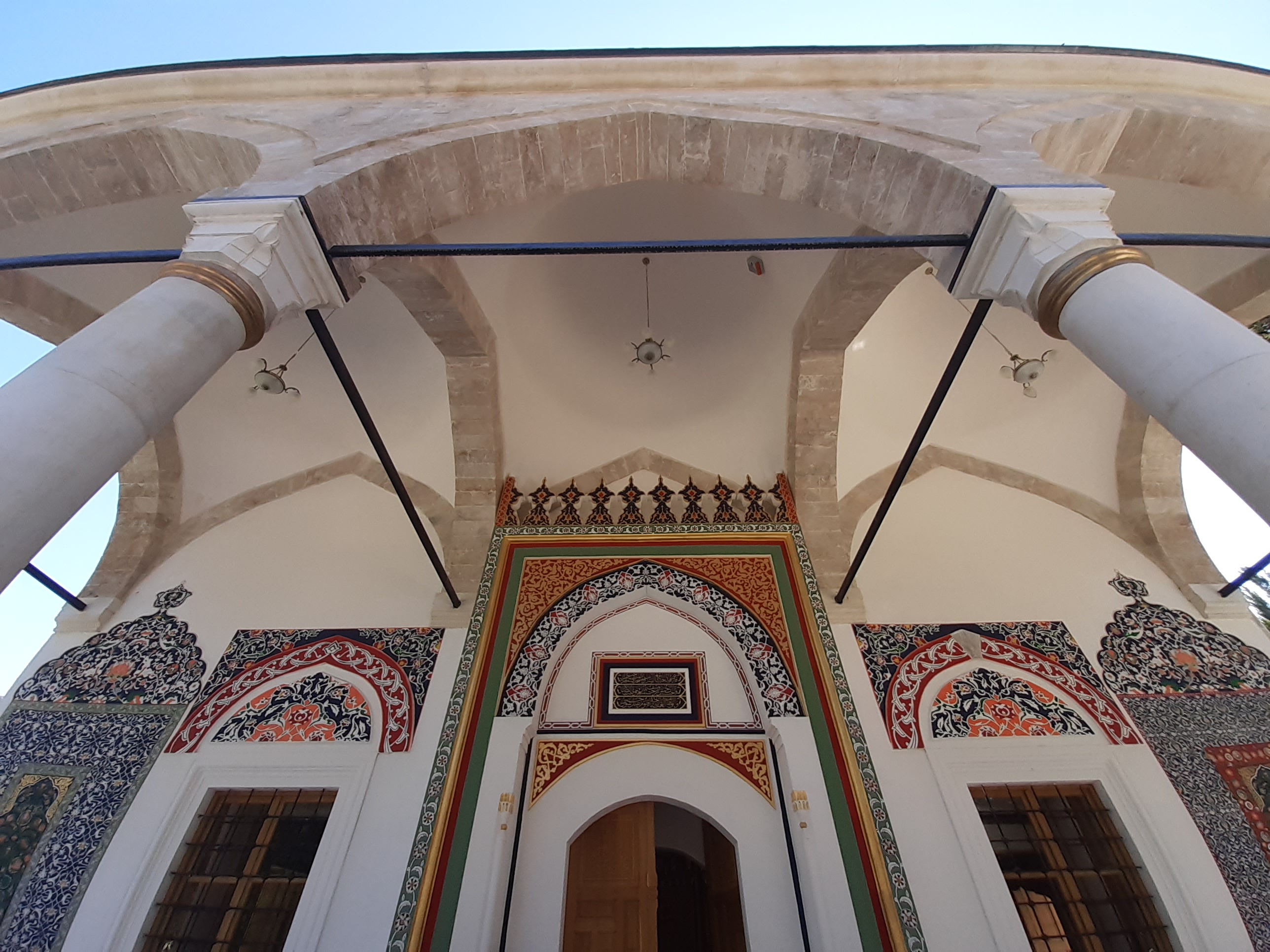
The rebuilt mosque

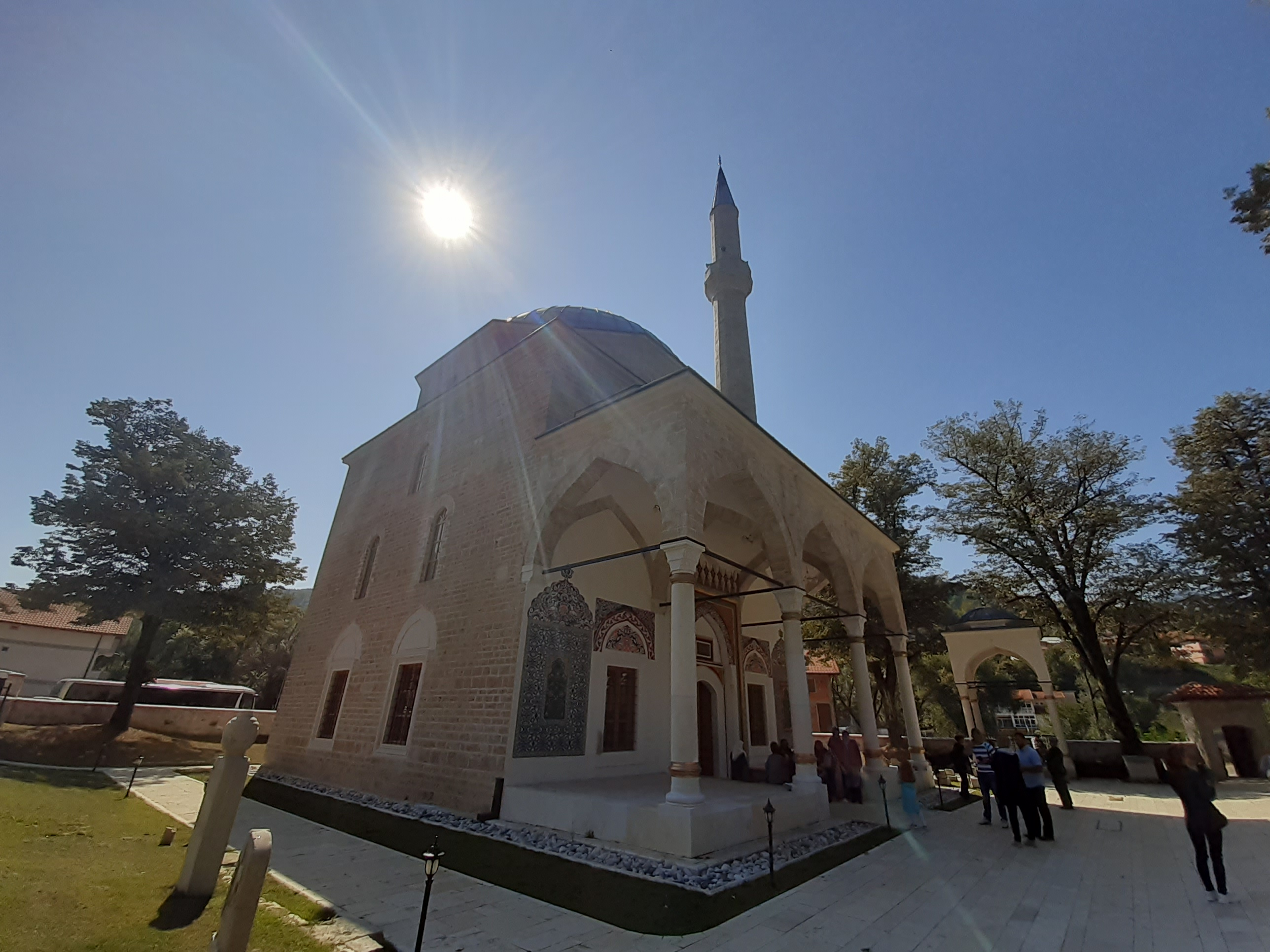
The rebuilt mosque

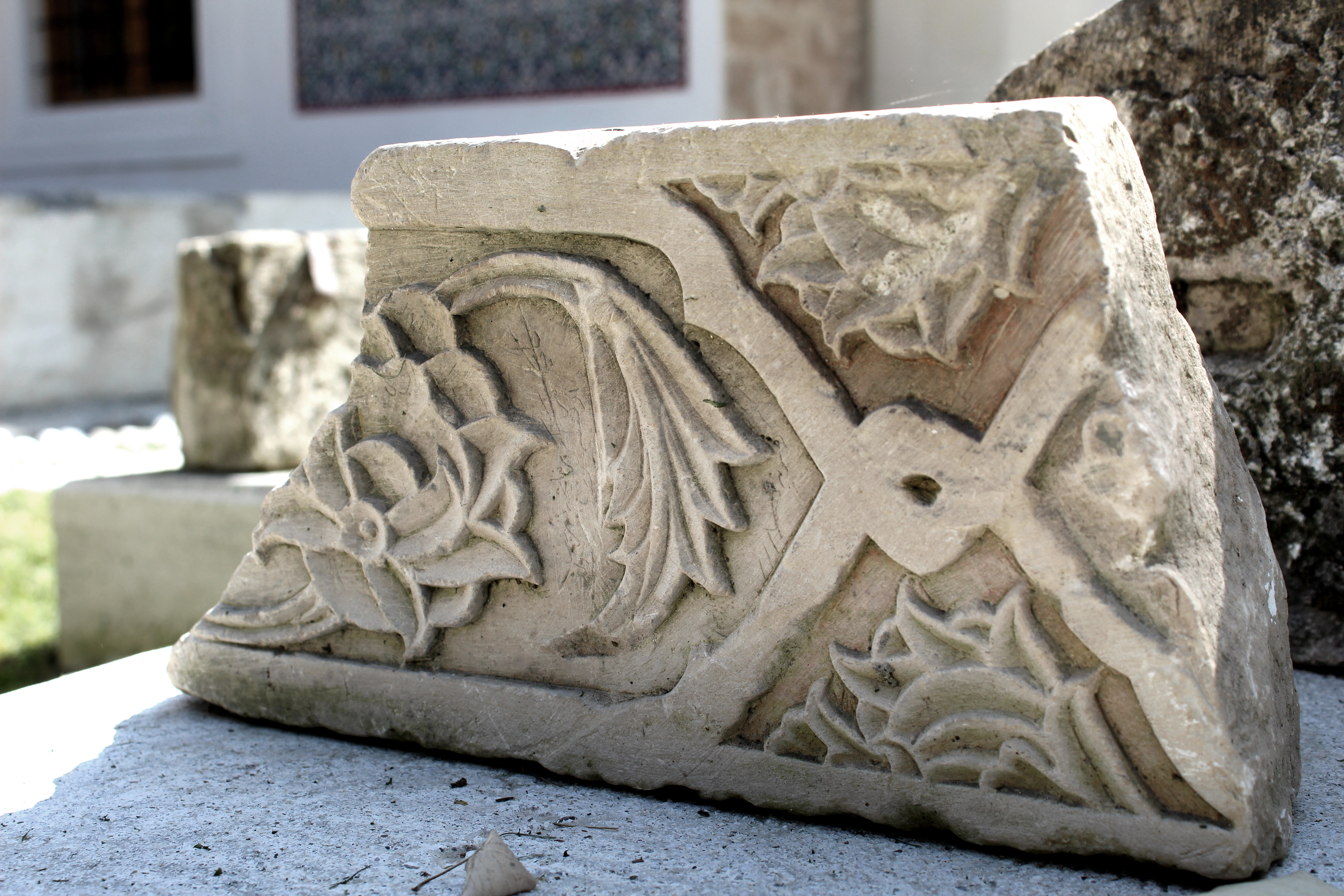
Remains of the old mosque

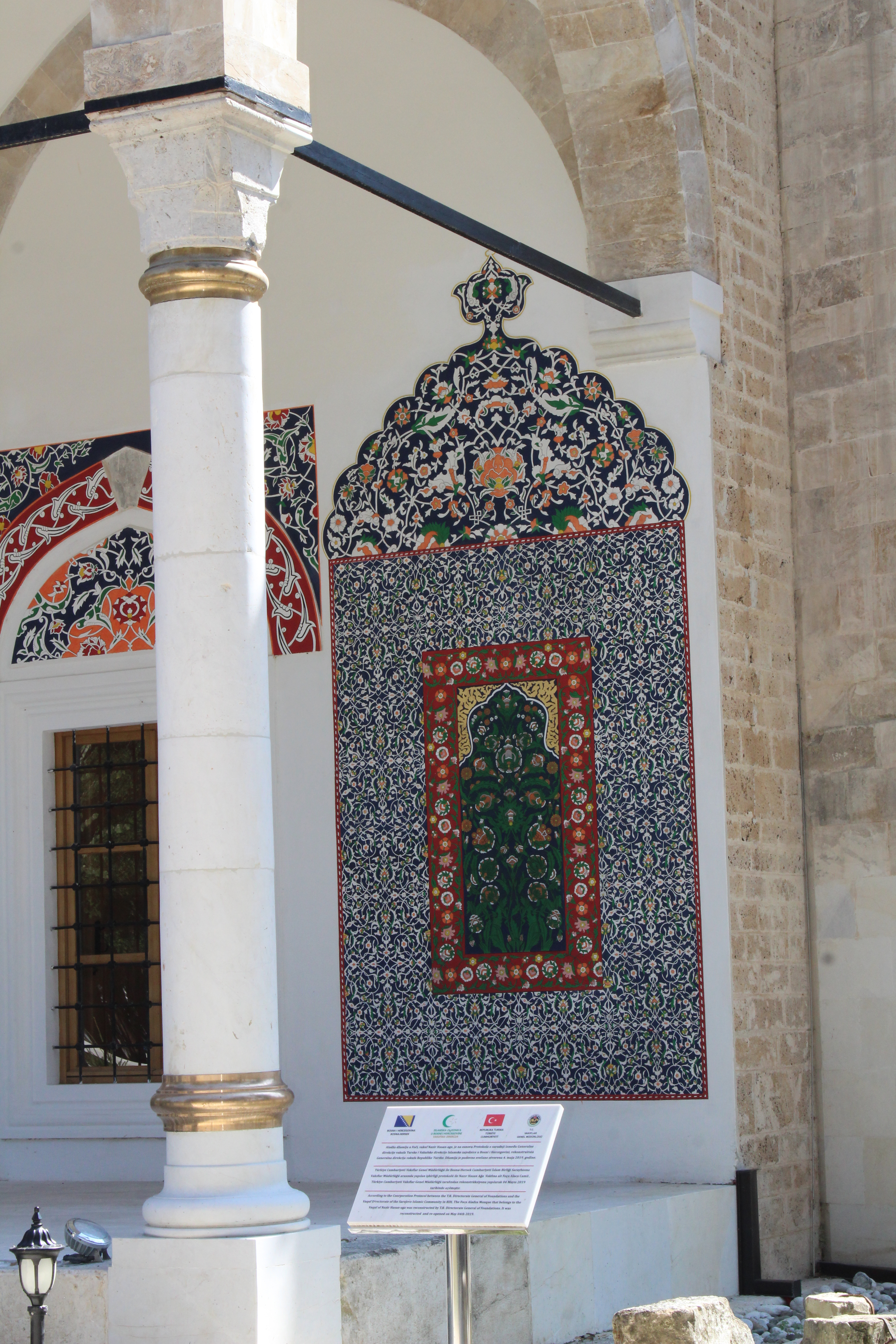
Decorations of the new mosque

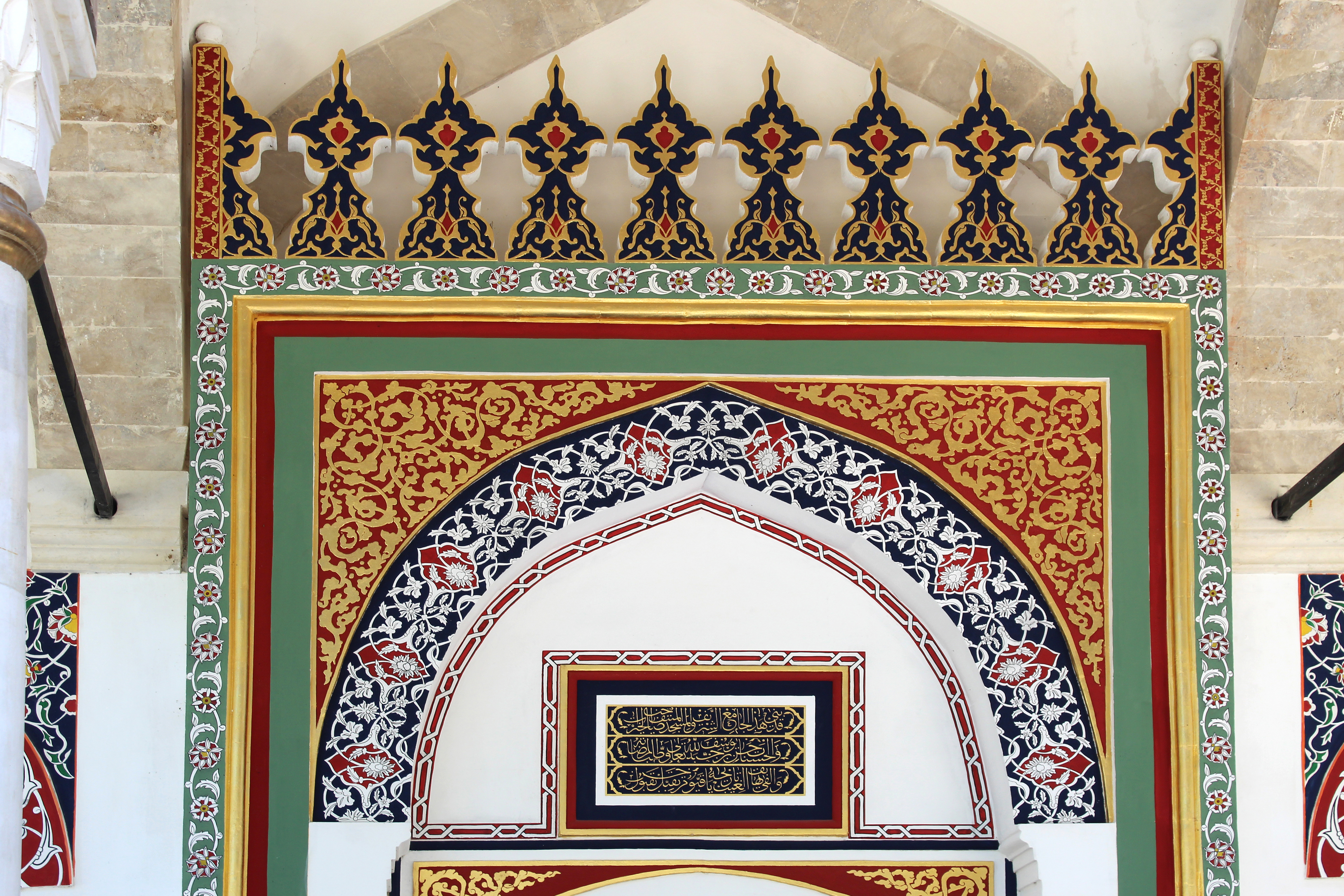
Decorations of the new mosque

== See also ==
- Islam in Bosnia and Herzegovina
- List of mosques in Bosnia and Herzegovina
