= 2001 Banja Luka riots =

Mass violent protests

2001 Banja Luka Riots
- Date: 7 May 2001
- Location: Banja Luka, Republika Srpska, Bosnia and Herzegovina
- Caused by: Attempted laying of the foundation stone for the reconstruction of Ferhat Pasha Mosque
- Methods: Violent protests, stone-throwing, arson, property destruction

Casualties
- Death: 1 (Murat Badić)
- Injuries: 30+ officially reported

The 2001 Banja Luka Riots refer to mass violent protests that occurred on 7 May 2001 in connection with the attempted laying of the foundation stone for the reconstruction of the Ferhat Pasha Mosque (Ferhadija) in Banja Luka. The event was marked by attacks on worshippers and international diplomats, the burning of property, and the killing of Murat Badić.

These riots are considered one of the most serious post-war incidents in Bosnia and Herzegovina related to the process of refugee return and the reconstruction of religious buildings.

== Background ==
The Ferhat Pasha Mosque, built in 1579, was one of the most significant monuments of Ottoman architecture in Bosnia and Herzegovina. The mosque was destroyed with explosives on 7 May 1993. during the Bosnian War.

The ceremony for laying the foundation stone for its reconstruction was symbolically scheduled for the eighth anniversary of its destruction, on 7 May 2001. The gathering was attended by a large number of worshippers from across the country, as well as high-ranking officials, including the head of the UN mission Jacques Paul Klein, U.S. ambassador Thomas Miller, and British ambassador Graham Hand. The atmosphere prior to the event was tense, and leaflets appeared in the city calling for the prevention of the mosque’s reconstruction.

== Course of the riots ==
At around 11 a.m., before the official start of the ceremony, several thousand demonstrators broke through police cordons in central Banja Luka. The gathered crowd pelted worshippers and guests with stones, eggs, glass bottles, and pyrotechnic devices. According to reports, the police of Republika Srpska did not respond adequately and at certain moments withdrew in the face of the violent crowd, allowing demonstrators access to the plateau.

The violence escalated with the burning of buses that had transported worshippers from the Federation of Bosnia and Herzegovina. At least eight buses were set on fire, as well as vehicles belonging to international organizations and a van of RTV BiH. Demonstrators shouted nationalist slogans, and the flag of the Islamic Community was replaced with a Serbian flag on the building of the majlis of the Islamic Community.

Approximately 300 officials and worshippers remained trapped in the majlis building for more than six hours under siege, until special police units and SFOR secured their evacuation. Dozens of people were injured in the riots (official reports state around 30 injured, while media reports mention higher figures of up to 150 people with minor injuries).

== Death of Murat Badić ==
Murat Badić (61), from the village of Gnjilavac near Cazin, traveled to Banja Luka to attend the ceremony. During the riots, Badić was attacked by a group of demonstrators. According to witness statements, he was struck in the head with a stone, and after he fell, the crowd continued to beat him while he lay helpless on the ground.

Badić sustained severe bodily injuries to the head and chest. He was initially treated at a hospital in Banja Luka and later transferred by ambulance to the Clinical Center in Sarajevo. He died on 26 May 2001, after spending 19 days in a coma.

== Responsibility and legal proceedings ==
The events prompted strong condemnations from the United Nations Security Council, the Office of the High Representative (OHR), and other international organizations. High Representative Wolfgang Petritsch accused the authorities of Republika Srpska of failures in securing the event. The then minister of the interior of Republika Srpska, Perica Bundalo, and the head of the Banja Luka Public Security Center, Vladimir Tutuš, resigned. British ambassador Graham Hand accused the Serb Democratic Party of organizing the attack.

Although several dozen individuals were detained and prosecuted for disturbing public order and participating in the riots, no one was criminally convicted for directly inflicting the fatal injuries on Murat Badić. The Badić family filed a lawsuit against Republika Srpska seeking compensation for police negligence, but the proceedings did not result in criminal accountability for the perpetrators.

One month later, the foundation stone for Ferhadija was nevertheless laid, under unprecedented security measures.
