= Ferhat Pasha Mosque (Banja Luka) =

Mosque in Banja Luka, Bosnia and Herzegovina

- Ferhat-pašina džamija
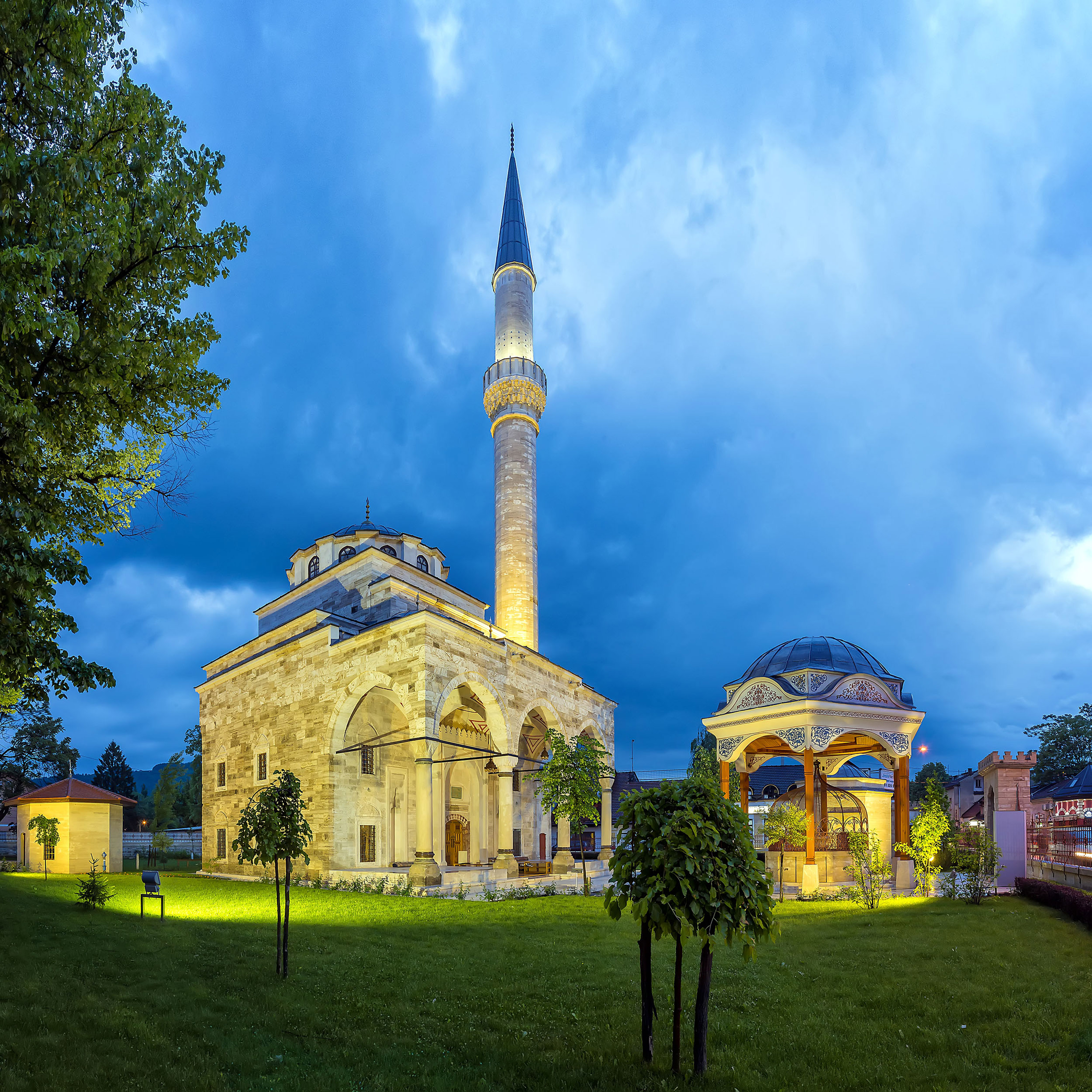

- Location of the mosque in Bosnia and Herzegovina

Religion
- Affiliation: Sunni Islam
- Ecclesiastical or organisational status: Mosque
- Status: Active

Location
- Location: Banja Luka, Republic of Srpska
- Country: Bosnia and Herzegovina
- Coordinates: 44°46′03″N 17°11′14″E

Architecture
- Architect: Pupil of Mimar Sinan
- Type: Mosque
- Style: Ottoman
- Completed: 1579 (original); 2016 (rebuilt)
- Destroyed: 7 May 1993 (during the Bosnian War)

Specifications
- Dome: 1
- Minaret: 1
- Minaret height: 41 m (135 ft)

KONS of Bosnia and Herzegovina
- Official name: Ferhad Pasha mosque (Ferhadija) in Banja Luka, Ferhad Pasha turbe, Safi-kaduna turbe, turbe of Ferhad Pasha's bajraktars, fountain, mosque graveyard and surrounding walls and portico (site and remains of architectural ensemble)
- Type: Category I cultural monument
- Criteria: II. Value; A, B, C i.ii.v.vi., D i.ii.iii.iv.v., E ii.iii.iv.v., F i.ii.iii., G i.ii.iii.iv., H ii.
- Designated: 7 May 2003
- Reference no.: 1326
- Decision no.: 08.2-6-533/03-8
- Listed: List of National Monuments of Bosnia and Herzegovina

Ferhat Pasha Mosque (Bosnian: Ferhat-pašina džamija; Turkish: Ferhad Paşa Camii), also known as the Ferhadija Mosque, is a mosque in the city of Banja Luka and one of the greatest achievements of Bosnia and Herzegovina's 16th century Ottoman Islamic architecture. The mosque was demolished in 1993 at the order of the authorities of Republika Srpska as part of an ethnic cleansing campaign. It was rebuilt and opened on 7 May 2016.

Commissioned by the Bosnian Sanjak-bey Ferhad Pasha Sokolović, the mosque was built in 1579 with money that, as tradition has it, was paid by the Auersperg family for the severed head of the Habsburg general Herbard VIII von Auersperg and the ransom for the general's son after a battle at the Croatian border in 1575, where Ferhad Pasha was triumphant.

The mosque, with its classical Ottoman architecture, was most probably designed by a pupil of Mimar Sinan, the Ottoman chief architect. There is no written data about the builders who erected the mosque, but from analysing its architecture it appears that the foreman of the works was from Sinan's school since the mosque shows obvious similarities with Sinan's Muradiye Mosque in Manisa, Turkey, which dates from 1586.

== Architectural ensemble ==
The ensemble of the Ferhadija mosque consisted of the mosque itself, the courtyard, a graveyard, the fountain, 3 mausoleums ("turbes") and the surrounding wall with the gate. The original canopied wall was pulled down after 1884 and a more massive wall partly of masonry and wrought iron was built with a new gate and a drinking fountain. In the courtyard there was an ablutions fountain ("šadrvan") with a stone basin and twelve pipes. The water for the fountain was brought from a spring that is still known as Šadrvan. Above the stone basin was a decorative wrought iron trellis, and in the 19th century a wooden baldaquin and dome and painted attic in the so-called Turkish baroque style was added which was demolished in 1955. One of three small adjacent mausoleums - Ferhad Pasha Turbe - contained the tombs of Ferhad Pasha Sokolović, the others were for his granddaughter Safi-kaduna, and his ensign. A clock tower ("Sahat kula") was added later.

Like most buildings of this type in Bosnia and Herzegovina, the mosque was on a modest scale: 18 metres (59 ft) wide, 14 metres (46 ft) long and 18 metres (59 ft) high at the top of the main dome. The minaret was 43 metres (141 ft) high. According to legend, when the mosque was completed in 1579, Ferhad Pasha had the masons locked inside this minaret, sentencing them to death so they could never make anything so beautiful, but one night they made wings and flew away.

Ferhadija was listed as a Bosnia and Herzegovina cultural heritage site in 1950. It was subsequently protected by UNESCO until its destruction in 1993. Today the site, with the mosque's remains, is listed by the Commission to preserve National Monuments of Bosnia and Herzegovina (KONS) as a National monument of Bosnia and Herzegovina.

== Destruction ==
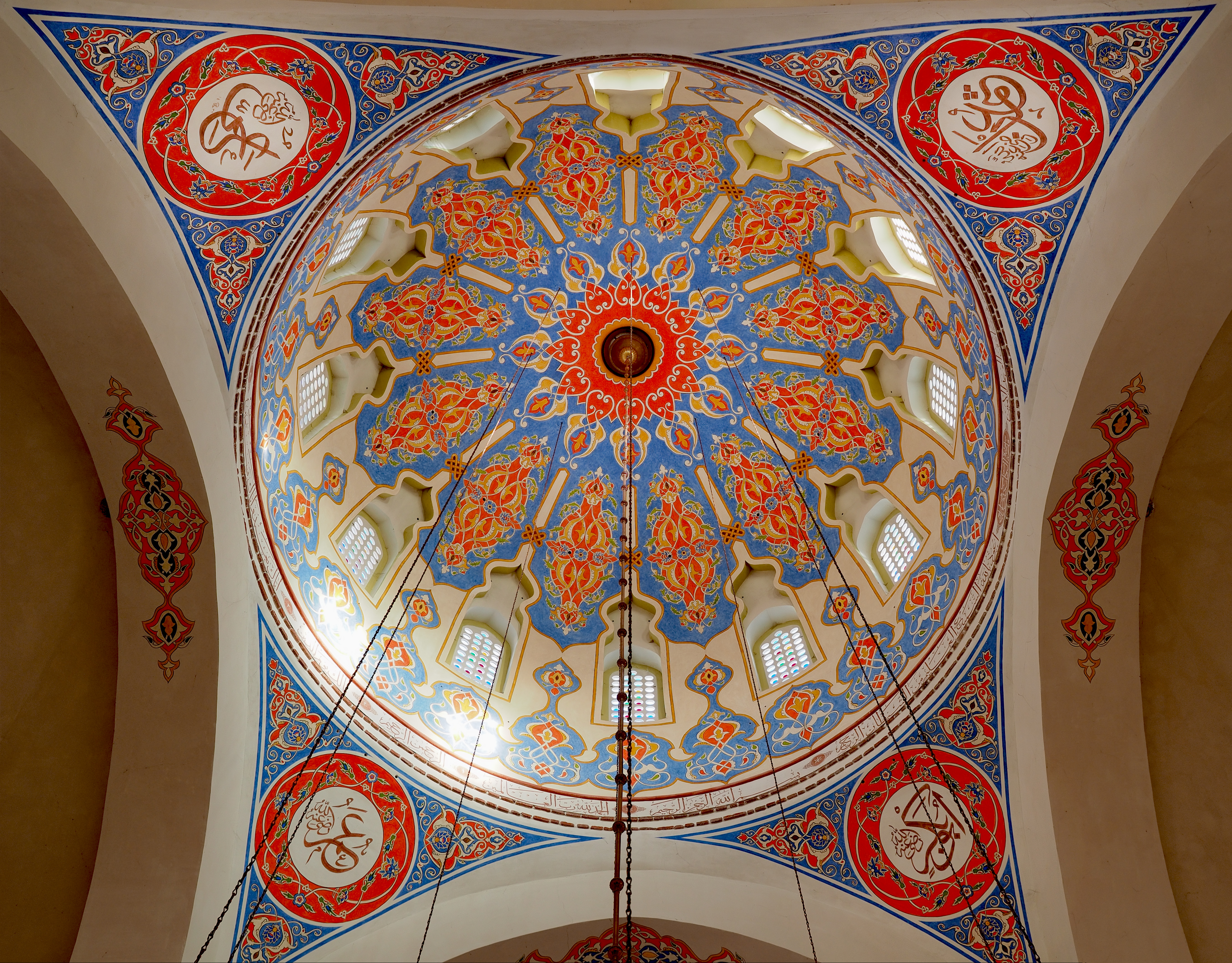
Dome of rebuilt Ferhadija Mosque

The mosque was one of 16 destroyed in the city of Banja Luka during the Bosnian War between 1992 and 1995 despite the fact that the city was spared any physical fighting.

The Ferhadija and Arnaudija mosques were destroyed on the night of 6–7 May 1993 within 15 minutes of each other. May 6 is the date of the Serbian Orthodox holiday of Đurđevdan (Saint George's day). The almost simultaneous destruction of the two mosques required large quantities of explosives and extensive coordination. This probably would not have been possible without the involvement of Banja Luka and Republika Srpska authorities.

The minaret of Ferhadija Mosque survived the first explosion, but was then razed to the ground.

Most of the debris was taken to a secret dump site; some stone, and ornamental details, were crushed for use as landfill or taken to a secret dump site. The leveled site was turned into a parking lot. Though Bosnian notables begged the Serb militia to keep the rubble, their pleas were denied. UN officials who tried to salvage pieces of the demolished mosque were detained by the Serb militia. Several weeks after the destruction of Ferhadija the nearby Sahat Kula, one of the oldest Ottoman clock towers in Europe, was also destroyed.

At the International Criminal Tribunal for the former Yugoslavia, a Serb leader from Banja Luka, Radoslav Brđanin, was convicted for his part in organizing the destruction of Muslim property including mosques, and also in the ethnic cleansing of non-Serbs. He was sentenced to a single prison term of 32 years. (Note: The ICTY Trial Chamber is satisfied beyond reasonable doubt both that the expulsions and forcible removals were systematic throughout the Autonomous Region of Krajina (ARK), in which and from where tens of thousands of Bosniaks and Bosnian Croats were permanently displaced, and that this mass forcible displacement was intended to ensure the ethnic cleansing of the region. These people were left with no option but to escape. Those who were not expelled and did not manage to escape were subjected to intolerable living conditions imposed by the Serb authorities, which made it impossible for them to continue living there and forced them to seek permission to leave. Bosniaks and Bosnian Croats were subjected to movement restrictions, as well as to perilous living conditions; they were required to pledge their loyalty to the Serb authorities and in at least one case, to wear white armbands. They were dismissed from their jobs and stripped of their health insurance. Campaigns of intimidation specifically targeting Bosniaks and Bosnian Croats were undertaken.)

The Brđanin case proved that the destruction of the mosques was orchestrated as part of an ethnic cleansing campaign. In addition, the Bosnian side in the Bosnian genocide case at the International Court of Justice has cited the destruction of Ferhadija Mosque as one of the elements of ethnic cleansing and genocide employed by the RS authorities during the Bosnian War. (Note: This process of ethnic cleansing was sometimes camouflaged as a process of resettlement of populations. In Banja Luka, the Agency for Population Movement and the Exchange of Material Wealth for the ARK ("Agency"), which was established on 12 June 1992 pursuant to a decision of the ARK Crisis Staff, aided in the implementation of both the exchange of flats and the resettlement of populations. The Agency was popularly known variously as "Perka's Agency" or as "Brđanin's Agency". The ICTY Trial Chamber is of the view that although this Agency was set up for the exchange of flats and the resettlement of populations, this was nothing else but an integral part of the ethnic cleansing plan.)

== Reconstruction ==
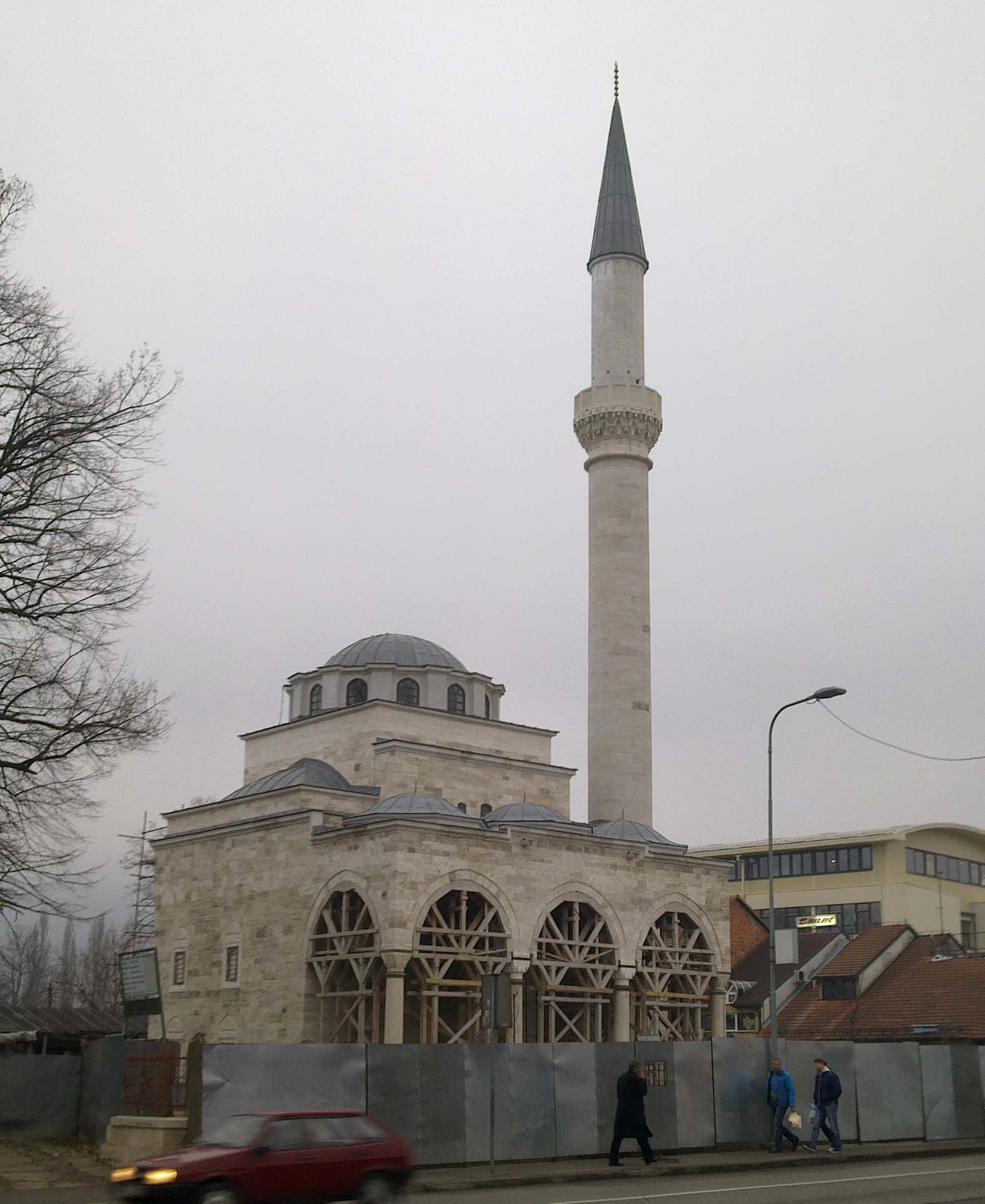
Ferhadija during reconstruction in 2014

In 2001, a building permit was granted to reconstruct the mosque. On May 7, Serb nationalists attacked about 300 Bosniaks attending the ceremony to mark the laying of the cornerstone. The New York Times reported that about 1,000 Orthodox Christian Serbs participated in the attack and threw rocks and burned vehicles, a bakery, Muslim prayer rugs, and the flag on the Islamic center, where they hoisted the Bosnian Serb flag; drove a pig onto the site of the mosque as an insult to Muslims; and trapped 250 people in the Islamic center including the head of the UN in Bosnia, the ambassadors from Great Britain, Sweden and Pakistan, and other international and local officials. Bosnian Serb police eventually released them. More than 30 Bosniaks were injured and at least eight were taken to the Banja Luka hospital. One died later from head injuries. The disrupted ceremony took place on the eighth anniversary of the mosque's destruction, a date subsequently chosen as the country's official Day of the Mosques. A few days later, in secret and under heavy security, the ceremony was performed successfully. But because of the earlier attack, reconstruction was not undertaken.

Although most of the mosques destroyed in Banja Luka in the Bosnian War have been reconstructed since 2001, Ferhadija is still a contentious issue. Work was delayed by the complexities involved in rebuilding it authentically. The Sarajevo School of Architecture's Design and Research Center had prepared preliminary studies, and the cost of reconstruction was estimated at 12 million KM (around $8 million). A local magistrate ruled that the authorities of Banja Luka, which is Bosnian Serb-controlled, must pay $42 million to its Islamic community for the 16 local mosques (including Ferhadija Mosque) that were destroyed during the 1992-1995 Bosnian War. However, this ruling was subsequently overturned by the highest court in Sarajevo when the Serb Republic objected to paying for the damage caused by individual people.

The site, with its original architectural remains, is listed as a National Monument of Bosnia and Herzegovina. By Ruling of the KONS the building was placed under state protection and entered in the register of cultural monuments. The Regional Plan for Bosnia and Herzegovina to 2002 listed the Ferhat Pasha Mosque in Banja Luka as a Category I building under serial no. 38.

In June 2007, repairs were completed on the foundations that survived the destruction, and reconstruction of the masonry and the rest of the building was completed over the next nine years, with the mosque reopening on 7 May 2016.

== See also ==
- Islam in Bosnia and Herzegovina
- List of mosques in Bosnia and Herzegovina
- List of National Monuments of Bosnia and Herzegovina
