= Mihran (disambiguation) =

Mihran is an Armenian masculine given name, also used by ancient Iranians as a surname and given name. It is derived from the Iranian name Mehran. Notable people with the name include:

- House of Mihran, extinct Iranian noble family
- Mihranids, Iranian family which ruled several regions of the Caucasus from 330 to 821
- Mihran Apikyan (1855–1938), Turkish Armenian writer and educator
- Mihran Azaryan (1876–1952), Turkish Armenian architect
- Mihran Bahram-i Chobin, 7th-century Iranian noble
- Mihran Damadian (1863–1945), Armenian freedom fighter, political activist, writer and teacher
- Mihran Hakobyan (born 1984), Iranian sculptor
- Mihran-i Hamadani (died 635), Iranian general
- Mihran Harutyunyan (born 1989), Armenian Russian wrestler
- Mihran Jaburyan (born 1984), Armenian wrestler
- Mihran Kassabian (1870–1910), Armenian American physician
- Mihran Mesrobian (1889–1975), Armenian American architect
- Mihran Poghosyan (born 1976), Armenian businessman and civil servant
- Mihran Razi (died 637), Iranian general and aristocrat
- Mihran Tsarukyan (born 1987), Armenian singer and actor

== Middle name ==
- Kegham Mihran Atmadjian (1910–1940), French Armenian poet and WWII soldier

== Surname ==
- Shapur Mihran, 5th–century Iranian general
- Golon Mihran, 6th–century Armenian general
- Raham Mihran, 5th–century Iranian general

== See also ==
- Mihran Mesrobian House, historic house, in Maryland, United States
- Mihran Halt railway station, railway station in Pakistan
- Mihrani, village in Diyarbakır, Turkey
- Mihranabad, village in Tehran, Iran
- Mihransitad, 6th-century Iranian noble
- Andranik Mihranyan (born 1949), Russian political scientist
