= Gordiya =

Iranian noblewoman of House of Mihran

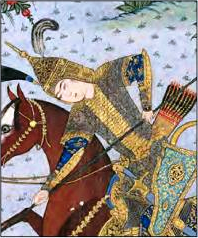
Illustration of Gordiya in the Shahnameh of Shah Tahmasp

Gordiya (also spelled Gurdiya and Kurdiyah) was an influential Iranian noblewoman from the House of Mihran, who was first the sister-wife of the distinguished military leader Bahram Chobin, then the wife of the Ispahbudhan dynast Vistahm, and ultimately the wife of the last prominent Sasanian emperor, Khosrow II.

== Background ==
Gordiya was a member of the House of Mihran, one of the seven Great Houses of Iran. The family was of Parthian origin, and was centered in Ray, south of Tehran, the capital of present-day Iran. Her father was Bahram Gushnasp, a military officer who had fought the Byzantines and campaigned in Yemen during the reign of Khosrow I (r. 531–579). Her grandfather Gurgin Milad had served as the marzban (general of a frontier province, "margrave") of Armenia from 572 to 574. Gordiya had three siblings who were Gorduya, Mardansina and most notably, Bahram Chobin, whom she married. It is however not known if she and Bahram were full siblings.

== Biography ==
In 590, Bahram mounted a large-scale rebellion against the Sasanian family, forcing the newly ascended ruler Khosrow II to flee, while taking the throne for himself. He was defeated and killed the following year. Not long after, Khosrow II's uncle Vistahm rebelled against him, carving a principality for himself in the entire eastern and northern quadrants of the Iranian realm. It was during this period that he married Gordiya, consequently increasing his status. His rebellion, however, also proved unsuccessful; according to some accounts, he was killed by Hephthalite subject Pariowk, whilst an alternative account states that it was Gordiya who killed him after being given the promise of marriage in return by Khosrow II. The 9th-century historian Dinawari mentioned a son of Gordiya and Khosrow, named Juvansher, as reigning as monarch of Iran briefly in 630. This king however remains obscure, and none of his coins have yet been found.

== Sources ==
- Al-Tabari, Abu Ja'far Muhammad ibn Jarir (1985–2007). Ehsan Yar-Shater (ed.). The History of Al-Ṭabarī. Vol. 40 vols. Albany, NY: State University of New York Press.
- Brosius, Maria. "WOMEN i. In Pre-Islamic Persia". Encyclopaedia Iranica, Vol. London et al.
- Pourshariati, Parvaneh (2008). Decline and Fall of the Sasanian Empire: The Sasanian-Parthian Confederacy and the Arab Conquest of Iran. London and New York: I.B. Tauris. ISBN 978-1-84511-645-3.
- Shahbazi, A. Sh. (1988). "Bahrām VI Čōbīn". Encyclopaedia Iranica, Vol. III, Fasc. 5. London et al. pp. 514–522.
- Shahbazi, A. Sh. (1989). "Besṭām o Bendōy". Encyclopaedia Iranica, Vol. IV, Fasc. 2. pp. 180–182.
