= Farrukhzad =

- Ispahbadh of Tabaristan
- Reign: 651–665
- Successor: Valash
- Born: 7th-century
- Died: 665; Tabaristan
- Issue: Shahram; Surkhab I Isfandyadh; Bahram; Farrukhan
- House: House of Ispahbudhan
- Dynasty: Bavand dynasty
- Father: Farrukh Hormizd
- Religion: Zoroastrianism

Farrukhzad (Middle Persian: Farrūkhzādag; New Persian: فرخزاد) was an Iranian aristocrat from the House of Ispahbudhan and the founder of the Bavand dynasty, ruling from 651 to 665. Originally a powerful servant of the Sasanian king Khosrow II (r. 590–628), he, along with several other powerful aristocrats, made a conspiracy against the latter and ended his tyrannical rule. They thereafter put Khosrow's son Kavadh II (r. 628) on the throne, whose rule lasted only a few months, before he was killed by a plague, being succeeded by his son Ardashir III (r. 628–629), who after only one year was murdered by the rebellious former Sasanian army chief (spahbed) Shahrbaraz, who usurped the throne.

These events greatly weakened the Sasanian Empire, but by 632, when Khosrow's grandson Yazdegerd III (r. 632–651) ascended the throne, order was somewhat restored. However, just as peace was about to come, the Sasanian Empire was invaded by Muslim Arabs, which resulted in the death of many Sasanian veterans, including Farrukhzad's brother Rostam Farrokhzad. Farrukhzad thereafter succeeded him as the spahbed and the leader of the Pahlav (Parthian) faction, which had been formed by their father Farrukh Hormizd, who was murdered in 631.

However, Farrukhzad was unable to defeat the Arabs, and was in 643, after having seen the loss of Ctesiphon and Spahan, Farrukhzad, along with Yazdegerd III, fled from one place to another until in 650, when Farrukhzad mutinied against his king, who was shortly killed by one of his servants. Farrukhzad later became the ruler of Tabaristan in 651, and would rule the region until his murder in 665 by Valash, a Karenid aristocrat, who thereafter conquered his domains.

== Name ==
Although his real name was "Farrukhzad" (meaning "the son of Farrukh" or "born with luck and happiness"), he is also known in other sources by various other names, such as Khurrazad, Zad Farrukh, Zinabi Abu'l-Farrukhan and Bav.

== Family ==
Farrukhzad was the son of Farrukh Hormizd, a prominent aristocrat from the Ispahbudhan family, who served as the army chief (spahbed) of the kusts of Adurbadagan and Khorasan—he was one of the generals who led the Sasanian army during the Byzantine–Sasanian War of 602–628, but in 626 along with his comrade Shahrbaraz rebelled against the Sasanian king Khosrow II (r. 590–628). Farrukhzad had one brother named Rostam Farrokhzad, who at that time resided in the Adurbadagan province.

== The war with the Byzantines and the overthrow of Khosrow II ==
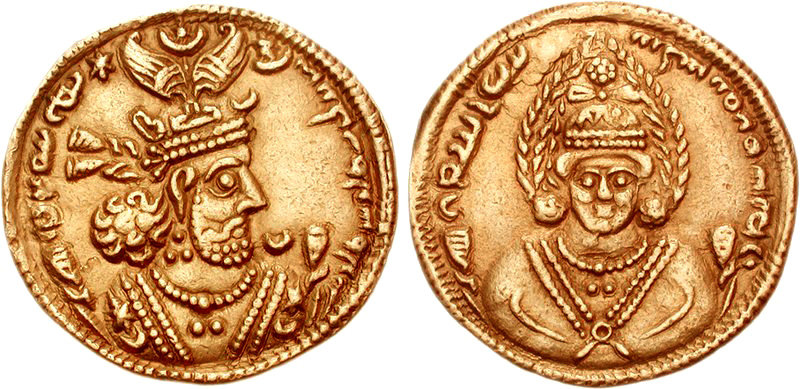
Coin of Khosrow II.

Farrukhzad is first mentioned during the reign of Khosrow II, where he occupied high offices and according to the Iranian poet Ferdowsi was "so close to Khosrow II that none dared to approach him without his permission". In 626, Shahrbaraz and Farrukhzad's father and brother rebelled. In 627, Khosrow then sent Farrukhzad to negotiate with Shahrbaraz, who was camping near the Sasanian capital of Ctesiphon. However, Farrukhzad secretly mutinied against Khosrow and joined Shahrbaraz. He then encouraged to remain undivided and not fear the fury of Khosrow. Furthermore, he also said that there were not any grandees (wuzurgan) who supported him.

Khosrow, however, began suspecting Farrukhzad of treachery but kept it to himself, because he did not want to make the situation worse than it already was. At the same time, Farrukhzad was assembling more people who opposed Khosrow in order to stage a coup d'état. In 628, Farrukhzad freed Khosrow's eldest son Sheroe from prison and along with several feudal families of the Sasanian Empire, captured Ctesiphon and imprisoned Khosrow. Sheroe was then crowned as the new king and became known by his dynastic name of "Kavadh II".

The feudal families which overthrew Khosrow included: Shahrbaraz, who represented the Mihran family; the House of Ispahbudhan represented by Farrukh Hormizd and his two sons Rostam Farrokhzad and Farrukhzad; the Armenian faction represented by Varaztirots II Bagratuni; and finally the Kanarangiyan faction represented by Kanadbak. Kavadh II thereafter ordered his vizier (wuzurg framadar) Piruz Khosrow to execute all his brothers and half-brothers, including Khosrow II's favorite son and heir Mardanshah. Three days later, Kavadh ordered Mihr Hormozd to execute his father. With the agreement of the nobles of the Sasanian Empire, Kavadh then made peace with the Byzantine emperor Heraclius. Furthermore, he also took all the properties of Farrukhzad and put him under arrest in Istakhr.

== The Sasanian civil war of 628-632 ==
Following the loss of territory required for the peace treaty, the embittered aristocracy started forming independent states within the Sasanian Empire, thus starting the Sasanian civil war of 628-632. This divided the resources of the country. Furthermore, dams and canals became derelict, and a devastating plague erupted in the western provinces of Iran, killing half of the population along with Kavadh II, who was succeeded by his 8-year-old son Ardashir III. Meanwhile, Farrukh Hormizd formed a faction in northern Iran known as the Pahlav (Parthian) faction, a faction of Parthians from several families who had rallied under him. During the time same time, however, Piruz Khosrow also formed a faction in southern Iran, known as the Parsig (Persian) faction.

On 27 April 629, Ardashir was overthrown and killed by Shahrbaraz, who then usurped the throne. Forty days later, however, Farrukh Hormizd killed him and made Khosrow's daughter Boran the new monarch of the Sasanian Empire. Boran then appointed Farrukh Hormizd as the minister of the empire. She, was, however, quickly deposed by Shahrbaraz's son Shapur-i Shahrvaraz, who after a brief reign was replaced by Azarmidokht, the sister of Boran. Azarmidokht, under the advice of the Sasanian nobles, recalled Farrukhzad from his arrest and invited him to serve the Sasanians once again. Farrukhzad, however, declined the invitation and refused to serve under a woman. He then retired in a fire temple at Istakhr.

In 631, Farrukh Hormizd, in order to seize power, asked Azarmidokht to marry him. Not daring to refuse, Azarmidokht had him killed with the aid of the Mihranid aristocrat Siyavakhsh, who was the grandson of Bahram Chobin, the famous spahbed and briefly shahanshah. She was however, shortly killed by Rostam Farrokhzad, who then restored Boran to the throne. Later in 632, Farrukhzad was once again invited to serve the Sasanians, this time by the newly crowned king Yazdegerd III, who was a puppet king of Farrukhzad's brother, Rostam Farrokhzad. Farrukhzad accepted and all his properties were restored to him.

== The Arab invasion of Iran ==
=== The invasion of western Iran ===
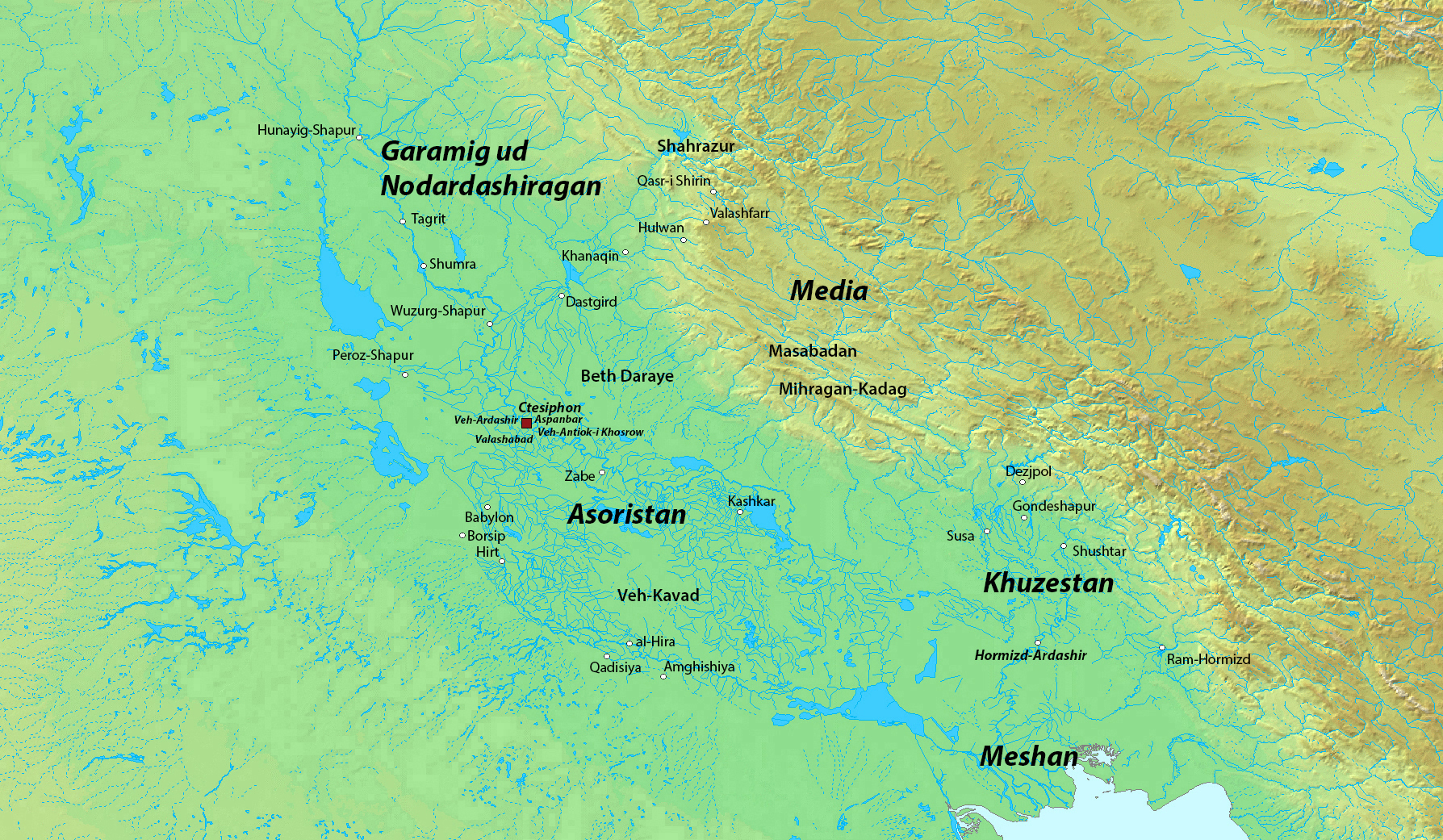
Map of Sasanian Mesopotamia and its surroundings.

In that same year the Arabs, united under the banner of Islam, invaded the Sasanian Empire. By 636, the Arabs were at al-Qadisiya, a town close to Ctesiphon, which made Rostam Farrokhzad take action himself. However, Farrukhzad was unable to take part, because he was serving as the marzban (general of a frontier province, "margrave") of Balasagan, a province far away from Ctesiphon.

While preparing to face the Arabs, he wrote a letter to Farrukhzad, which said that he should raise an army and go to Adurbadagan, while reminding him that Yazdegerd III was the only heritage left from the Sasanians. Rostam then set out from Ctesiphon in command of a large Sasanian force to confront the Arabs. The battle lasted three days, Rostam being defeated and killed during the last day.

After the death of his brother, Farrukhzad succeeded him as the spahbed of Khorasan and Adurbadagan, and as the new leader of the Ispahbudhan family and the Pahlav faction. He then raised an army at Adurbadagan, and went to Ctesiphon, where he was appointed as its commander by Yazdegerd III, who fled to Hulwan with his property, family and 1,000 servants. Farrukhzad, however, also fled to Hulwan after a small and disheartening clash with the Arabs. In 637, Ctesiphon was captured by the Arabs. Meanwhile, Farrukhzad, along with Yazdegerd III, the Mihranid officer Mihran Razi, Piruz Khosrow, and Hormuzan, left Hulwan for Adurbadagan, but while they were moving to the place, they were ambushed by an Arab army at Jalula, where they were defeated. Mihran Razi was killed during the battle, while Hormuzan had fled to Khuzestan and Piruz Khosrow to Nahavand. In 642, the Arabs captured Nahavand and Spahan, killing Piruz Khosrow including other Sasanian officers such as Shahrvaraz Jadhuyih and Mardanshah. During the same year (or in 643), Farrukhzad raised another army with his son Isfandyadh and the Dailamite general Muta. They were, however, defeated at Waj Rudh, a village in Hamadan. Meanwhile, Yazdegerd III fled to southern Iran and stayed there until 648. It is not known if Farrukhzad was with Yazdegerd III during his stay in southern Iran.

=== Flight to Khorasan, rule and death ===
Around 650, Yazdegerd III, along with Farrukhzad, arrived to Khorasan. Yazdegerd III then appointed Farrukhzad as the governor of Merv and ordered Baraz, the son of Mahoe Suri, to give absolute control of the city over to him. Mahoe, however, disobeyed him. Farrukhzad then advised Yazdegerd III to take refugee in Tabaristan. Yazdegerd III, however, did not accept his advice. Farrukhzad later made a mutiny against Yazdegerd III and left for Ray, to avenge his father against Siyavakhsh, who was the ruler of the city. On his way to Ray, he met his ally Kanadbak, who was part of the conspiracy against Khosrow II and had taken part in Rostam's clash with the Arabs, but after the defeat had fled to Tus, a city which was part of his domains. Farrukhzad then continued his journey to Ray, but before reaching the city met the Arab general Nu'aym near Qazvin in 651, whom he made peace with.

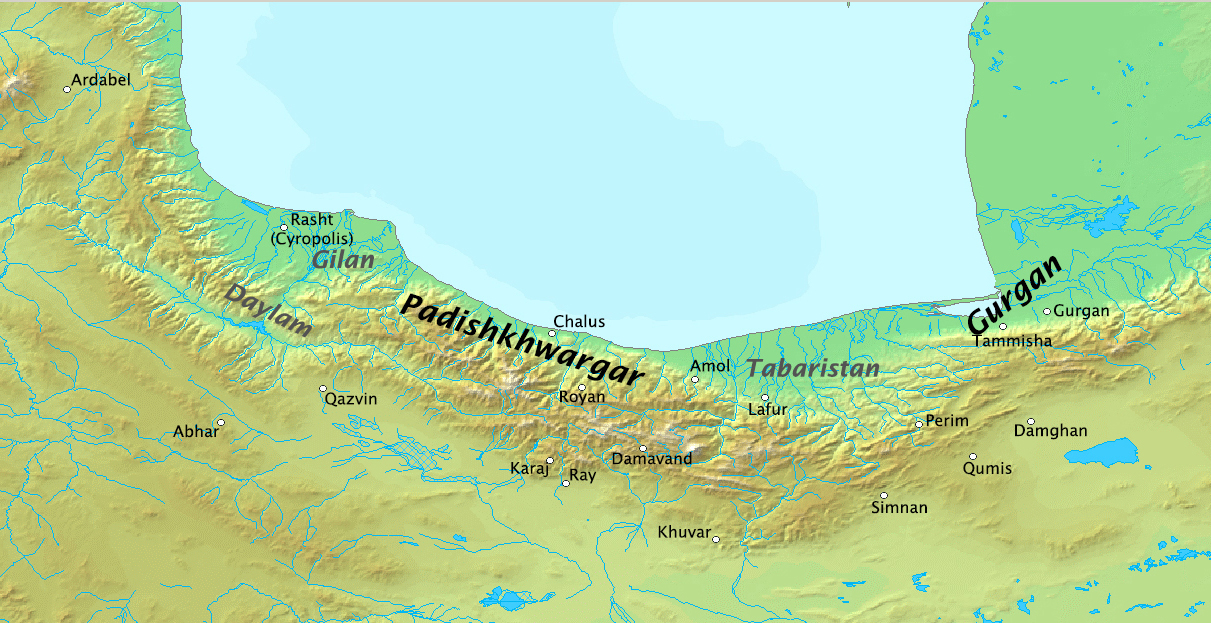
Map of northern Iran during the Arab invasion of Iran.

He then agreed to aid the Arabs against Siyavakhsh. The combined Ispahbudhan-Arab then engaged in a night battle against Siyavakhsh's army at the foot of the mountain just outside Ray. Farrukhzad led some of Nu'aym's cavalry by a little-known way into the city, from where they attacked the Mihranid army's rear, causing great bloodshed. Siyavakhsh's army was in the end defeated and he was himself killed. To set an example, Nu'aym then ordered the destruction of the aristocratic quarter of Ray. However, the town was later rebuilt by Farrukhzad, who became the ruler of Ray.

Farrukhzad then went to Tabaristan, but at his arrival, he heard about the death of Yazdegerd under the orders of Mahoe Suri, which made him shave his hair and live as a monk in a fire temple at Kusan. When the Arabs invaded Tabaristan, Farrukhzad was requested by the locals to become their king, which he gladly accepted and which marked the foundation of the Bavand dynasty. He then gathered an army, defeated the Arabs, and made a peace treaty with them. Farrukhzad would rule Tabaristan including some parts of Abarshahr peacefully in 14 years, until he was murdered around 665 by a Karenid nobleman named Valash, whose family was at war with Farrukhzad's family.

After Farrukhzad's death, his son Surkhab I fled to an Ispahbudhan/Bavand stronghold named Kula. Later in 673, Surkhab avenged his father by killing Valash, and then reconquered his fathers realm. He thereafter crowned himself as ispahbadh (ruler) of the Bavand dynasty at his capital in Perim.

== Family tree ==
Bawi
Shapur
Vinduyih	Vistahm
Farrukh Hormizd	Tiruyih	Vinduyih
Rostam Farrokhzad	Farrukhzad
Shahram	Surkhab I	Isfandyadh	Bahram	Farrukhan

== Sources ==
- Ahmad Hasan Dani, B. A. Litvinsky, Vadim Mikhaĭlovich Masson, History of Civilizations of Central Asia: The Crossroads of Civilizations, p. 228.
- Pourshariati, Parvaneh (2008). Decline and Fall of the Sasanian Empire: The Sasanian-Parthian Confederacy and the Arab Conquest of Iran. London and New York: I.B. Tauris. ISBN 978-1-84511-645-3.
- Zarrinkub, Abd al-Husain (1975). "The Arab conquest of Iran and its aftermath". The Cambridge History of Iran, Volume 4: From the Arab Invasion to the Saljuqs. Cambridge: Cambridge University Press. pp. 1–57. ISBN 978-0-521-20093-6.
- Daryaee, Touraj (2012). The Oxford Handbook of Iranian History. Oxford University Press. pp. 1–432. ISBN 978-0199875757. Archived from the original on 2019-01-01.
- Shahbazi, A. Sh. (1988). "BAHRĀM (2)". Encyclopaedia Iranica, Vol. III, Fasc. 5. pp. 514–522.
- Morony, Michael G. (2005) [1984]. Iraq After The Muslim Conquest. Gorgias Press LLC. ISBN 978-1-59333-315-7.
- Shapur Shahbazi, A. (2005). "SASANIAN DYNASTY". Encyclopaedia Iranica, Online Edition.

Farrukhzad Bavand dynasty
Preceded by None	King of Tabaristan; 651-665	Succeeded by Valash
