= Muslim conquest of Azerbaijan =

Conquest of Azerbaijan by the Muslims

- Part of the early Muslim conquests
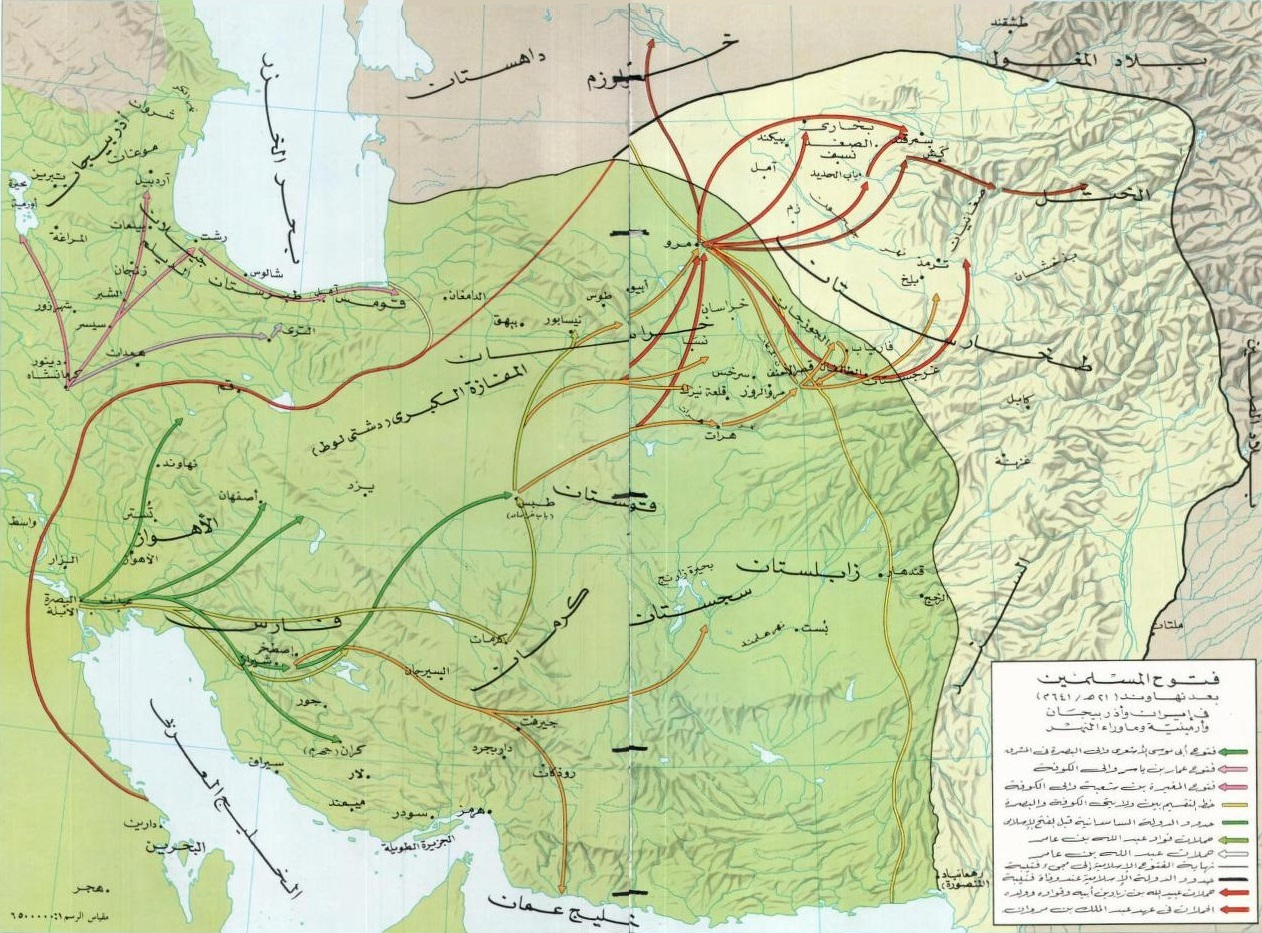
- Persia under Muslim control after various conquests, including the one of Azerbaijan (upper left corner)
Date	643–645
Location	Adurbadagan (modern-day Azerbaijan in Iran), Balasagan and Arran (modern-day Republic of Azerbaijan)
Result	Muslim victory
Territorial changes	Incorporation of the Adurbadagan into the Rashidun Caliphate; Expansion of the Rashidun into the region of Azerbaijan (Iran), the Caucasus and Armenia

Belligerents
Rashidun Caliphate	Sasanian Empire

Commanders and leaders
Umar ibn al-Khattab X Uthman ibn Affan; Al-Mughirah bin Shuba; Hudhayfah ibn al-Yaman; Bukayr ibn Abdallah	Yazdegerd III; Isfandyadh; Bahram VII

Azerbaijan was conquered by the Rashidun Caliphate bwteen 643 and 645. In AD 643 (AH 22), after the occupation of Rey and Central Eranshahr, Caliph Umar ordered the conquest of Adurbadagan. The Rashidun Caliphate continued the conquest toward Adurbadagan first under the force of Al-Mughira. This was reported by Abu Jafar Tabari, quoting the report from Ahmad bin Thabit al Razi.

== History ==
Umar appointed Hudheifa to the command of the campaign. Hudheifa first marched to Zanjan. The local garrison defended itself but was eventually overpowered and the city fell.

The Muslim forces proceeded to Ardabil where the Persians did not resist and surrendered on the usual terms of Jizya (the annual tax levied on non-Muslims). From Ardabil, the Muslim forces marched northward along the western coast of the Caspian Sea. A confrontation ensued at the Bab area which was an important port on the Caspian Sea. The Muslims scored another victory, but for unknown reasons, Hudheifa was recalled.

The Persians then launched a counterattack, causing the Muslims to abandon their forward posts in Adurbadagan. As a response, Umar sent expeditionary forces to Adurbadagan, one led by Bukayr ibn Abdallah and another by Utba bin Farqad. The contingent under Bukayr confronted the Persians at Jurmizan. The Persians were commanded by Espandiyar. The battle was quite severe, the Persians were defeated and their commander Espandiyar was captured alive. Espandiyar asked Bukayr, "Do you prefer war or peace?" to which Bukayr replied that the Muslims preferred peace. Espandiyar thereupon said, "Then keep me with you till I can help you in negotiating peace with the people of Adurbadagan". The Persians went to nearby hill forts and shut themselves within. The Muslim army captured the entire area in the plains.

During the year of 25 AH, the Mushaf Uthmani of Quran was created in an attempt to avoid linguistic confusion of Qur'an which had been translated to local dialect of Adurbadagan and Armenia. Hudhaifa warned Uthman that the translation would lose its original Tafseer if it failed to standardise in the original Mushaf version first, before the locals could translate and give commentary.

== Aftermath ==
Bukayr ibn Abdallah, who had recently subdued Adurbadagan, was assigned to capture Tiflis. From Bab at the western coast of the Caspian Sea, Bukayr marched north. Umar decided to practice his traditional and successful strategy of multi-pronged attacks. While Bukayr was still miles away from Tiflis, Umar instructed him to divide his army into three corps. Umar appointed Habib ibn Muslaima to capture Tiflis, Abdulrehman to march north towards the mountains and Hudheifa to march towards the southern mountains. Habib captured Tiflis and the region up to the eastern coast of the Black Sea. Abdulrehman marched north to the Caucasus Mountains and subdued the tribes. Hudheifa marched south-west to the mountainous region and subdued the local tribes there. The advance into Armenia came to an end with Umar's death in November 644. By then, almost all of South Caucasus had been captured.

After 645, forces under Al-Walid ibn Uqba campaigned in four-year rotations in two frontier districts (Thughur) of Rey and Adurbadagan. One quarter of their army consisting of 40,000 men from Kufa campaigned each year with around 4000 in Rey and 6000 in Adurbadagan.
