= Saman Khuda =

8th-century Iranian founder of the Samanid dynasty

Saman Khuda (also Saman Khoda, Saman-khudat; Persian: سامان‌خدا، سامان‌خدات) was an 8th-century nobleman and the eponymous ancestor of the Samanid dynasty. He was a dehqan (landlord) from the village of Saman in Balkh province in present-day northern Afghanistan.

== Origins ==
His origins are disputed, with Iranian or Sogdian roots suggested. The Samanids themselves later claimed Saman was a fourth- or fifth-generation descendant of the famed Sassanian general Bahram Chobin, of the ancient House of Mihran. It has also been suggested that he was of Hephthalite princely background. The name Saman Khuda is usually interpreted as meaning 'landlord (dehqan) of the town of Saman'.

In the early 8th century, he came to Merv, seat of the Caliphal governor of Khorasan, Asad ibn 'Abd Allah al-Qasri (ruled 723-727). Saman was originally a Zoroastrian. However, he was impressed by the piety of al-Qasri and converted to Islam. He named his son Asad, allegedly in the governor's honour. He was also influenced by the teachings of the scholar Abu Hanifa.

Caliph al-Ma'mun (r. 813–833) subsequently appointed Asad's four sons – Saman Khuda's grandsons – as governors of Samarkand, Ferghana, Shash and Ustrushana, and Herat in recognition of their role in the suppression of a revolt. This marked the beginning of the Samanid dynasty. Saman Khuda's great-grandson Isma'il ibn Ahmad (849–907) became Amir of Transoxiana and Khorasan, founding the Samanid Empire.

== Family tree ==
Bahram Gushnasp
Mardansina	Unknown	Bahram Chobin	Gorduya	Gordiya
Noshrad	Mihran Bahram-i Chubin	Shapur
Siyavakhsh
Toghmath
Jotman
Saman Khuda

== Sources ==
- Frye, R.N. (1975). "The Sāmānids". In Frye, R.N. (ed.). The Cambridge History of Iran, Volume 4: From the Arab Invasion to the Saljuqs. Cambridge: Cambridge University Press. pp. 136–161. ISBN 0-521-20093-8.
