= Siyavakhsh =

Iranian aristocrat

Siyavakhsh (also spelled Siyavash) was an Iranian aristocrat from the House of Mihran who was descended from Bahram Chobin, the famous spahbed of the Sasanian Empire.

== Biography ==
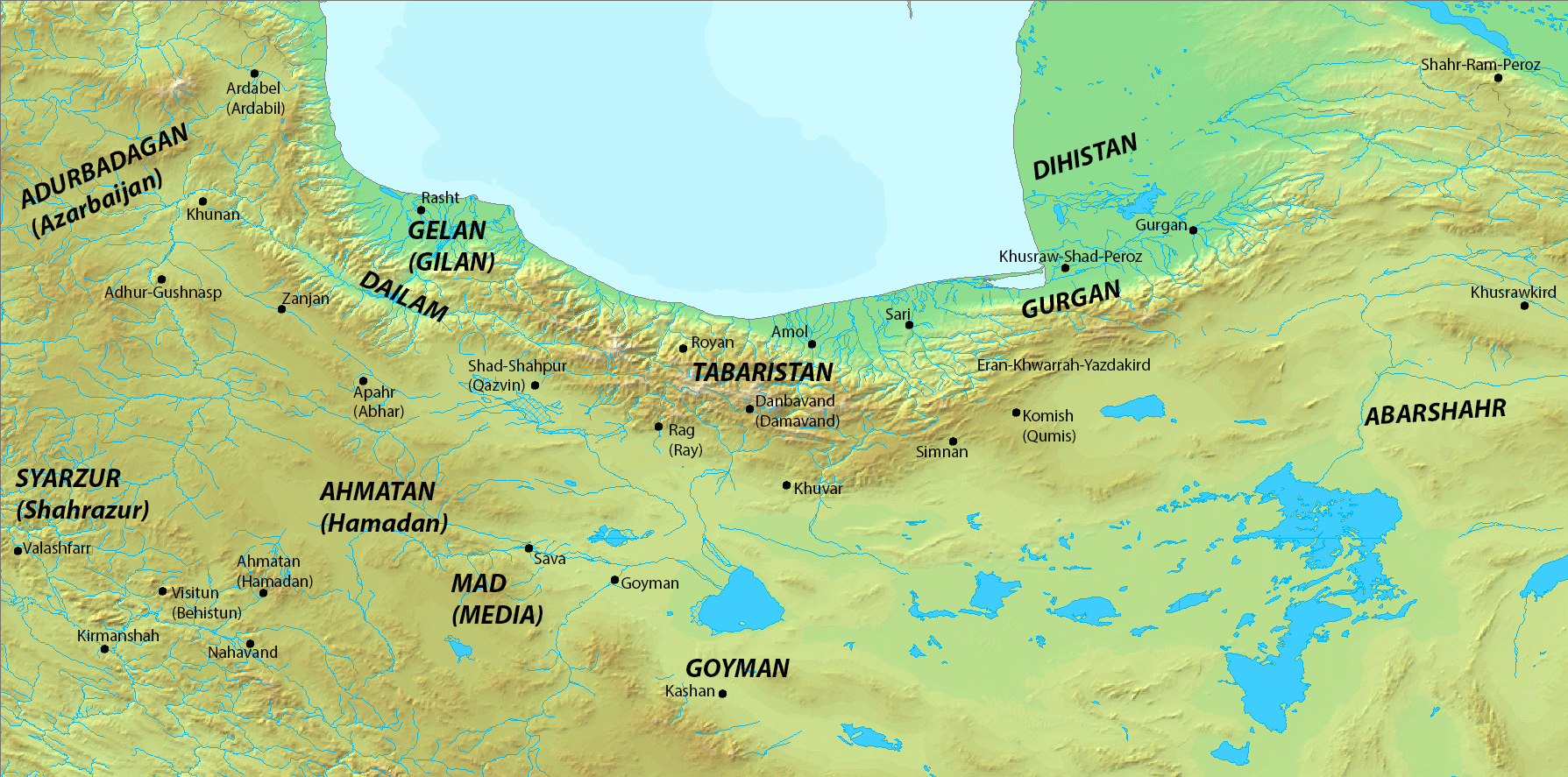
Map of northern Iran during Sasanian rule.

Siyavakhsh was the son of Mihran Bahram-i Chubin, whose father was Bahram Chobin. Siyavakhsh is first mentioned during the first years of the fall of the Sasanian Empire, where he is said to have ruled Ray as a Sasanian vassal king. When Azarmidokht ascended the Sasanian throne as empress regnant in 630, the powerful spahbed (army chief) Farrukh Hormizd asked her to marry him. Not daring to refuse, Azarmidokht requested Siyavakhsh's aid, who murdered Farrukh Hormizd.

In 632, this civil war ended and the wuzurgan agreed to make Yazdegerd III emperor. However, during the same time, the Arabs, united under the banner of Islam, invaded the Sasanian Empire. Although there were still numerous pagan and Christian Arabs who opposed the Muslim Arabs.

By 651, most of the Sasanian Empire had been conquered by the Arabs, Ray being one of the last Sasanian major cities left. Thus the Arab al-Nu'man ibn Muqrin marched towards Ray, and sent a message to them: "The Arab army has set out toward Rayy, and the Arabs have spread elsewhere. None can stand up to them. And Yazdegerd III is far from us." Siyavakhsh then requested help from the people of Damavand, Tabaristan, Qumis, and Gorgan. Mardanshah of Damavand and other petty rulers agreed to help and sent reinforcements to Siyavakhsh. Unfortunately for Siyavakhsh, Farrukh Hormizd's son Farrukhzad, who had mutinied against Yazdegerd III and knew the environs of Ray very well, made a peace treaty with al-Nu'man at Qazvin and agreed to help him against Siyavakhsh.

The ensuing Battle of Ray was fought as a night battle at the foot of the mountain just outside Ray. Farrukhzad led some of al-Nu'aym's cavalry by a little-known way into the city from where they attacked the Mihranid army's rear, causing great bloodshed. Siyavakhsh's army was in the end defeated and he was himself killed. To set an example, al-Nu'aym then ordered the destruction of the aristocratic quarter of Ray. However, the town was later rebuilt by Farrukhzad, who became the ruler of Ray.

== Family tree ==
Bahram Gushnasp
Mardansina	Unknown	Bahram Chobin	Gorduya	Gordiya
Noshrad	Mihran Bahram-i Chubin	Shapur
Toghmath	Siyavakhsh
Jotman
Saman Khuda

== See also ==
- Siyâvash

== Sources ==
- Pourshariati, Parvaneh (2008). Decline and Fall of the Sasanian Empire: The Sasanian-Parthian Confederacy and the Arab Conquest of Iran. London and New York: I.B. Tauris. ISBN 978-1-84511-645-3.
- Zarrinkub, Abd al-Husain (1975). "The Arab conquest of Iran and its aftermath". The Cambridge History of Iran, Volume 4: From the Arab Invasion to the Saljuqs. Cambridge: Cambridge University Press. pp. 1–57. ISBN 978-0-521-20093-6.
- Daryaee, Touraj (2012). The Oxford Handbook of Iranian History. Oxford University Press. pp. 1–432. ISBN 978-0199875757.
- Shahbazi, A. Sh. (1988). "BAHRĀM (2)". Encyclopaedia Iranica, Vol. III, Fasc. 5. pp. 514–522.
