= Ganzak =

Ancient town located south of Lake Urmia, capital of Media

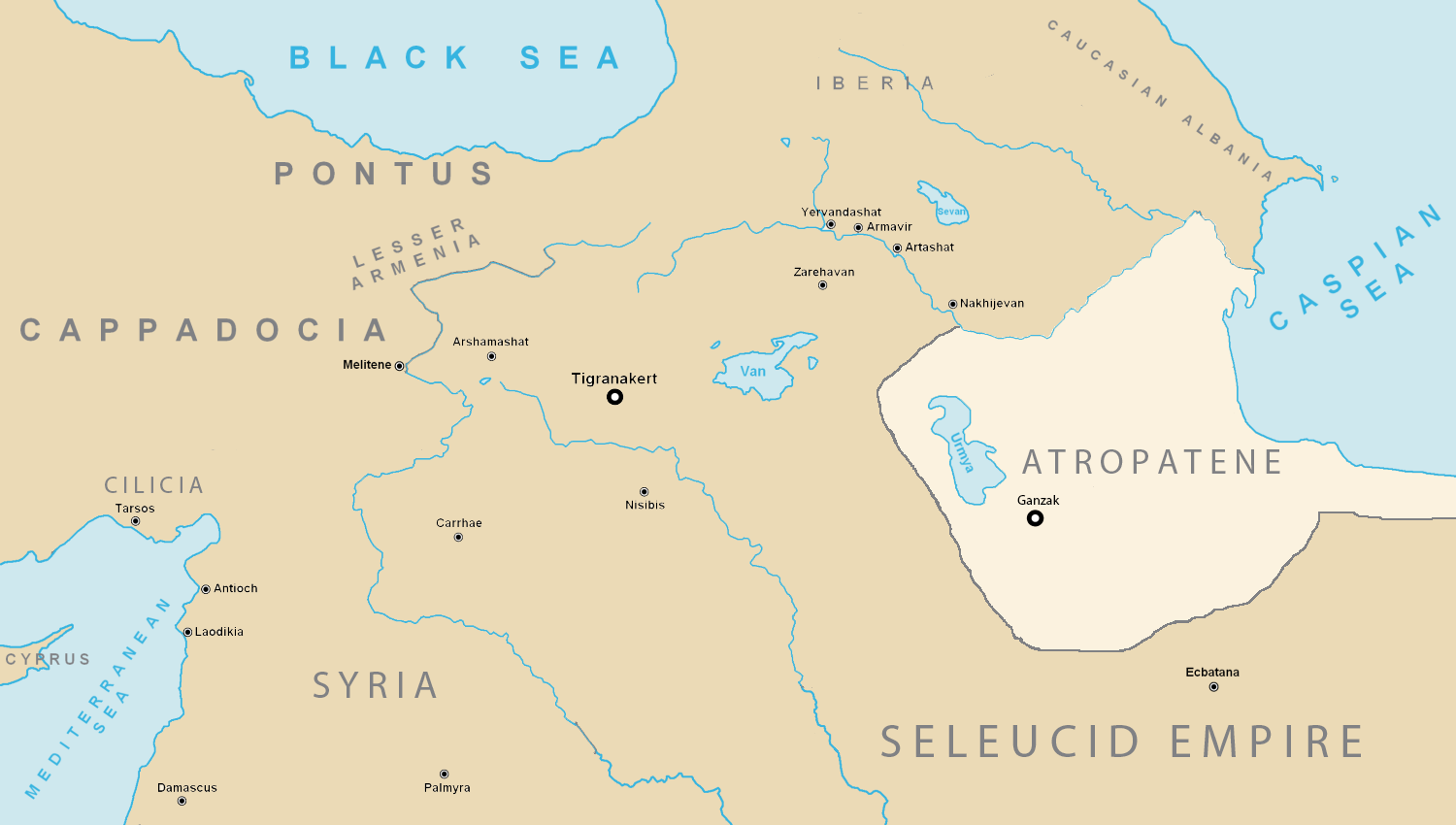
Ganzak located on the map of Atropatene.

Ganzak (Note: Persian: گنزک, romanized: Ganzak, pronounced [gænˈzæk]; Greek: Γάζακα, romanized: Gázaka, pronounced [ˈɣaz̠aka]; Latin: Gazaca, pronounced [ˈgazaka]; Arabic: جنزق, romanized: Janzaq, pronounced [ˈd͡ʒanzaq]; Armenian: Գանձակ, romanized: Gandzak, pronounced [ɡɑnˈd͡zɑk]) is an ancient town founded in northwestern Iran. The city stood somewhere south of Lake Urmia, and it has been postulated that the Persian nobleman Atropates chose the city as his capital. The exact location, according to Minorsky, Schippmann, and Boyce, is identified as being the ruins (37.011555°N, 46.193187°E) at Leylan, Malekan County in the Miandoab plain.

== Etymology ==
The word ganzak means "treasury", and is of Armenian origin (gandzak). It was adopted into Persian by the Achaemenid Empire, as the name is related to the Persian word for "treasury", گنج ganj.

== History ==
Ganzak was built by the Achaemenids and was the seat of the satrap of Media. During the 4th century BC, the city became part of the domains of the Persian aristocrat Atropates, who had deserted to Alexander the Great, and had probably made Ganzak his capital. The kingdom of Atropates became known as the “Atropatene”. During the rule of this kingdom, the sacred fire temple Adur Gushnasp was constructed.

In ca. 148 BC, the kingdom of Atropatene became a vassal state of the Parthian Empire. In 36 BC, the Romans besieged Ganzak. Still, they were defeated by a combined force under the Atropatenian king Artavasdes I and the Parthian king Orodes II. In ca. 224 AD, the Sasanian king Ardashir I (r. 224–242) put an end to the Atropatenian kingdom. However, the name still survived, and instead of being merged with Media was a province of its own, where Ganzak continued to be the capital.

In 591, the Battle of Blarathon occurred near Ganzak between the Sasanian king Khosrow II (590–628) and the usurper Bahram Chobin (r. 590–591). The battle ended in a defeat for Bahram Chobin, who fled to Khorasan. In 622, Ganzak was sacked by the Roman/Byzantine emperor Heraclius, who also destroyed the sacred fire temple Adhur Gushnasp as retribution for the sacking of Jerusalem. The Byzantine sources reported that Ganzak was a large town with “about 3,000 houses”.

The governor of Atropatene, Farrukh Hormizd, did not resist the Byzantines due to an alliance he had made with them along with the military rebel Shahrbaraz. In 651, during the Muslim conquest of Persia, the governor of Atropatene, Isfandyadh, became a vassal of the Rashidun Caliphate. Some years later, however, Isfandyadh disappeared from mention, and Atropatene thus must have been incorporated into the Rashidun administration. Ganzak, no longer the capital of Atropatene, survived under the Muslims but was destroyed sometime during the late medieval era. Leylan, a town close to Ganzak, became its successor.

== See also ==
- Eustathius of Mtskheta
