= Mihran Bahram-i Chobin =

Mihran Bahram-i Chubin was an Iranian nobleman from the House of Mihran. He was the son of Bahram Chobin, the famous Sasanian spahbed and briefly shahanshah. Mihran, with the aid of Christian Arab tribes, fought against the Muslim Arabs at Ayn al-Tamir. He was however, defeated. What happened to Mihran afterwards is unknown; however, it is known that he had a son named Siyavakhsh, who fell to the Arabs in 651 at Ray.

== Family tree ==
Bahram Gushnasp
Mardansina	Unknown	Bahram Chobin	Gorduya	Gordiya
Noshrad	Mihran Bahram-i Chubin	Shapur
Siyavakhsh
Toghmath
Jotman
Saman Khuda

== Sources ==
- Pourshariati, Parvaneh (2008). Decline and Fall of the Sasanian Empire: The Sasanian-Parthian Confederacy and the Arab Conquest of Iran. London and New York: I.B. Tauris. ISBN 978-1-84511-645-3.
- Zarrinkub, Abd al-Husain (1975). "The Arab conquest of Iran and its aftermath". The Cambridge History of Iran, Volume 4: From the Arab Invasion to the Saljuqs. Cambridge: Cambridge University Press. pp. 1–57. ISBN 978-0-521-20093-6.
- Shahbazi, A. Sh. (1988). "BAHRĀM (2)". Encyclopaedia Iranica, Vol. III, Fasc. 5. pp. 514–522.
