= Surkhab I =

Surkhab I (Persian: سهراب) was the second ruler of the Bavand dynasty from ca. 673 to 717.

He was the son of Farrukhzad, a Parthian nobleman from the Ispahbudhan family, a family which had a long story of service to the Sasanians, tracing his descent back to Bawi. Surkhab also had four brothers named Isfandyadh, Shahram, Bahram, and Farrukhan. In 665, Farrukhzad was murdered by a Karenid named Valash, who then had his domains conquered. After the murder of his father, Surkhab fled to a Bavand stronghold in Mazandaran. In 673, Surkhab avenged his father by killing Valash, and then reconquered lost Bavand territory. He then crowned himself as ispahbadh of the Bavandids at his capital in Perim. Surkhab died in 717, and was succeeded by his son Mihr Mardan.

== Sources ==
- Madelung, W. (1975). "The Minor Dynasties of Northern Iran". In Frye, R.N. (ed.). The Cambridge History of Iran, Volume 4: From the Arab Invasion to the Saljuqs. Cambridge: Cambridge University Press. pp. 198–249. ISBN 978-0-521-20093-6.
- Madelung, W. (1984). "ĀL-E BĀVAND (BAVANDIDS)". Encyclopaedia Iranica, Vol. I, Fasc. 7. London u.a.: Routledge & Kegan Paul. pp. 747–753. ISBN 90-04-08114-3.
- Pourshariati, Parvaneh (2008). Decline and Fall of the Sasanian Empire: The Sasanian-Parthian Confederacy and the Arab Conquest of Iran. London and New York: I.B. Tauris. ISBN 978-1-84511-645-3.

Preceded by Valash	Bavand ruler ca. 673–717	Succeeded by Mihr Mardan
