= Battle of Ray =

Battle of Ray may refer to:

- Battle of Ray (651)
- Battle of Ray (811)
- Battle of Ray (1194)
