= Bozorgmehr =

6th-century Iranian sage and dignitary

- Dādburzmihr
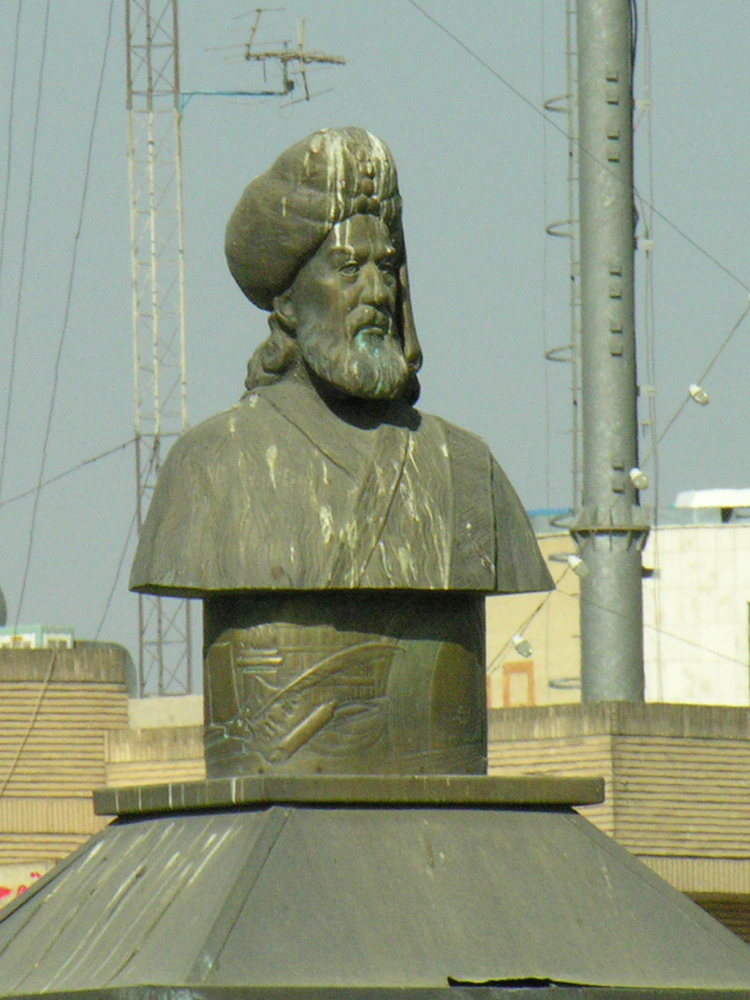
- Sculpture of Bozorgmehr in Bozorgmehr Square, Isfahan, Iran
- Died: 580s
- Relatives: Sukhra (father)
- Military career
- Allegiance: Sasanian Empire
- Rank: Wuzurg framadar; Spahbed

Bozorgmehr-e Bokhtagan (Middle Persian: Wuzurgmihr ī Bōkhtagān), also known as Burzmihr, Dadmihr and Dadburzmihr, was an Iranian sage and dignitary from the Karen family, who served as minister (wuzurg framadār) of the Sasanian king (shah) Kavad I (r. 498–531), and the latter's son and successor Khosrow I (r. 531–579). He also served as the military commander (spahbed) of Khwarasan under Khosrow I and his successor Hormizd IV (r. 579–590). According to Persian sources, Bozorgmehr was a man of "exceptional wisdom and sage counsels" and later became a characterisation of the expression. His name appears in several important works in Persian literature, most notably in the Shahnameh ("The Book of Kings"). The historian Arthur Christensen has suggested that Bozorgmehr was the same person as Borzuya, but historiographical studies of post-Sasanian Persian literature, as well as linguistic analysis shows otherwise. However, the word "Borzuya" can sometimes be considered a shortened form of Bozorgmehr.

== Name ==
The name of the Bozorgmehr (meaning "large sun" or "one of great kindness") is the New Persian variant of Middle Persian Wuzurgmihr ī Bōkhtagān, which was later transformed in Arabic as Abūzarjmehr, Bozorjmehr, or Būzorjmehr. Ferdowsi used the last variant in the Shahnameh ("The Book of Kings"). Etymologically the latter is a corruption of Burzmihr or Dād-Burzmihr, also reported as Zarmihr. Its proper version was Dādburzmihr, with Būrzūmihr being the original variant in ancient engravings. The name is attested as Dadburzmihr ("given by the high Mihr") in a seal, a theophoric name that emphasizes the Mihr worship of Bozorgmehrs clan, the Karenids. The -i Bōkhtagān suffix is a patronymic name meaning "son of Bokhtagan", a title held by Bozorgmehrs father.

== Background ==
Bozorgmehr is first mentioned in 498, as one of the nine sons of the powerful nobleman Sukhra. He belonged to the House of Karen, one of the Seven Great Houses of Iran, which was descended from the Arsacid prince Karen. The Karen family claimed descent from the legendary Pishdadian shah Manuchehr, and were based in Nihavand in Media. After the defeat and death of the Sasanian shah Peroz I (r. 459–484) at the battle of Herat, Sukhra became the de facto ruler of Iran. He was eventually defeated and executed by Kavad I, which resulted in the Karen family being heavily weakened, with many of its members being exiled to the regions of Tabaristan and Zabulistan, which was away from the Sasanian court in Ctesiphon. In 496, Kavad I was deposed and imprisoned due to his support of the Mazdakite movement, and also for having Sukhra executed.

== Career ==
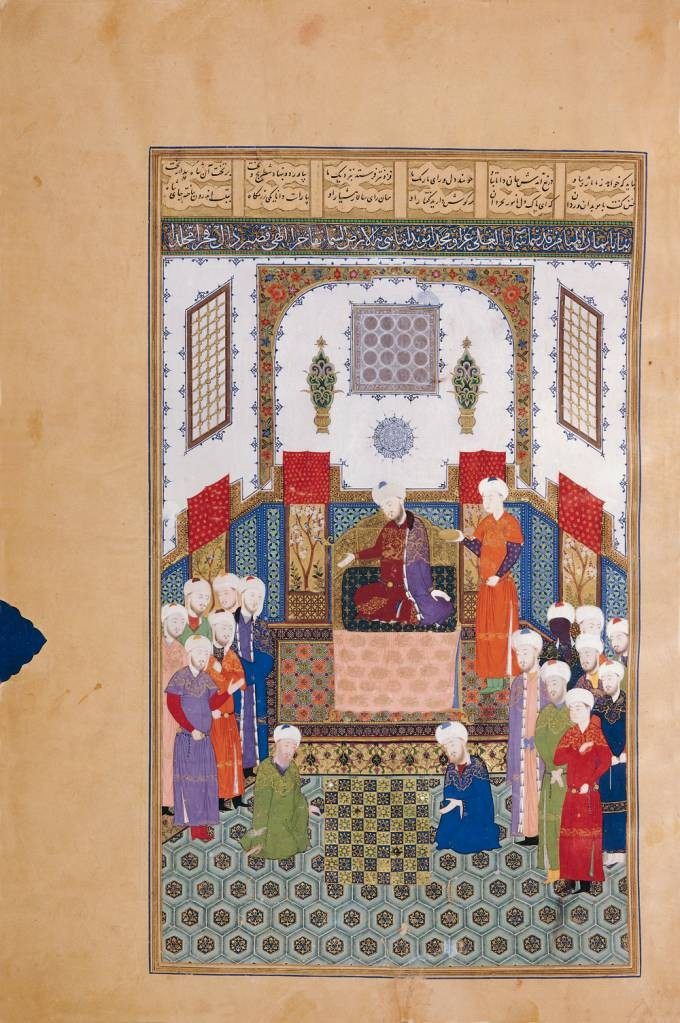
Bozorgmehr challenges the Indian envoy to a game of chess.

After Kavad I had reclaimed the Sasanian throne from his younger brother Jamasp in 498, he appointed Bozorgmehr as his minister (wuzurg framadār). During his tenure, Bozorgmehr persuaded Kavad to stop taxation on fruits and grain from the peasantry. An early reference to Bozorgmehr is found in the Aydāgār ī Wuzurgmihr, in which he is called an argbed—a high-ranking title in the Sasanian and Parthian periods. Among other sources, later mention of him is made in the Shahnameh and in al-Tha'alibi’s Ghurar and al-Masudi’s Murūj al-Dhahab. During the reign of Kavad I's son and successor, Khosrow I (r. 531–579), Bozorgmehr continued his tenure as minister of the shah. He further rose to prominence after being appointed as a military commander (spahbed) of the kust (frontier region) of Khorasan (Khwarasan) by Khosrow I, who reportedly regretted Kavad I's approach to the family.

During the reign of Khosrow I's son Hormizd IV (r. 579–590), Bozorgmehr continued to serve as spahbed of the Khorasan. Two seals of Bozorgmehr have been found; Through both of them Bozorgmehr emphasizes his Parthian ancestry by claiming to be a Parthian aspbed (aspbed-i pahlaw). According to Ferdinand Justi, Bozorgmehr was later executed by the order of Hormizd IV. His execution probably lead to the legendary story of the royal resentment reported in various versions by al-Masudi, Ferdowsi, and al-Tha'alibi. The versions of Ferdowsi and al-Tha'alibi, which link Bozorgmehr with the reign of Khosrow I, he was reportedly pardoned by the shah, who was well-known for his fairness. In the version of al-Masudi, Bozorgmehr was linked with the reign of Khosrow II, where no mention of his execution is made.

Bozorgmehr's descendants continued to remain active in Iran, with one of them, Adhar Valash, ruling Tabaristan and Gurgan under the last Sasanian shah, Yazdegerd III (r. 632–651). His grandson, Valash, ruled Tabaristan from 665 to 673.

== Works ==
Several Middle Persian treatises were written by Bozorgmehr. Most famous is the Wizārišn ī čatrang ("Treatise on Chess"), also known as the Chatrang Nama ("Book of Chess"). As well as; Ayādgār ī Wuzurgmihr ī Bōxtagān, Ketāb al-Zabarj (the original version a commentary on Vettius Valens’s Astrologica), Ketāb Mehrāzād Jošnas ("Book of Mehrāḏar Jošnas") and the Ẓafar-nāma ("Book of Victory", a book written in Middle Persian, that was translated into New Persian by Avicenna.

== Sources ==
- Chaumont, M. L.; Schippmann, K. (1988). "Balāš, Sasanian king of kings". Encyclopaedia Iranica, Vol. III, Fasc. 6. pp. 574–580.
- Daryaee, Touraj (2014). Sasanian Persia: The Rise and Fall of an Empire. I.B.Tauris. pp. 1–240. ISBN 978-0857716668.
- Khaleghi-Motlagh, Djalal (1989a). "Bozorgmehr-e Boktagan". Encyclopaedia Iranica, Vol. IV, Fasc. 4. pp. 427–429.
- Khaleghi-Motlagh, Djalal (1989b). "Borzūya". Encyclopaedia Iranica, Vol. IV, Fasc. 4. pp. 381–382.
- Pourshariati, Parvaneh (2017). "Kārin". Encyclopaedia Iranica.
- Pourshariati, Parvaneh (2008). Decline and Fall of the Sasanian Empire: The Sasanian-Parthian Confederacy and the Arab Conquest of Iran. London and New York: I.B. Tauris. ISBN 978-1-84511-645-3.
- Schindel, Nikolaus (2013a). "Kawād I i. Reign". Encyclopaedia Iranica, Vol. XVI, Fasc. 2. pp. 136–141.
- Majidi, Maryam; Negahban, Farzin. "Buzurgmihr". In Madelung, Wilferd; Daftary, Farhad (eds.). Encyclopaedia Islamica Online. Brill Online. ISSN 1875-9831.
