= Battle of Ray (651) =

651 CE battle between the Rashidun Caliphate and Sasanian Empire

- Part of Islamic conquest of Persia
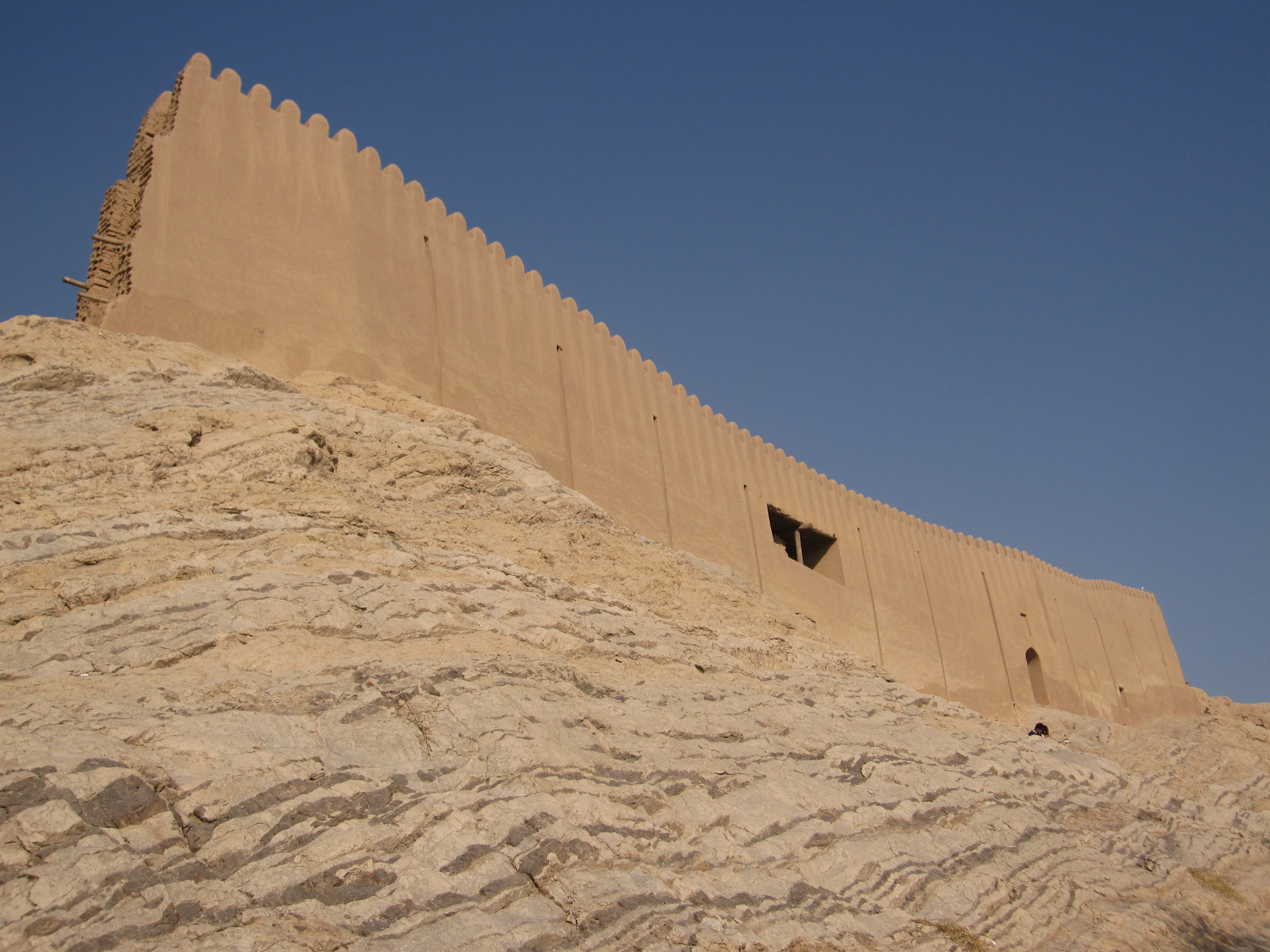
- Picture of the Ray Castle, constructed under the Parthian Empire, the kinsmen of the Mihran family.
Date	651
Location	Ray, Iran
Result	Muslim-Ispahbudhan victory

Belligerents
Rashidun Caliphate; House of Ispahbudhan	Sasanian Empire; House of Mihran

Commanders and leaders
Nu'aym ibn Muqarrin; Farrukhzad	Siyavakhsh †

Strength
Unknown	Unknown

Casualties and losses
Low	Heavy

The Battle of Ray was fought between the Sasanians and the Rashidun Caliphate in 651. It was also part of the rivalry between the Ispahbudhan family and the Mihran family.

== Background ==
In 642/643, the Muslim Arabs had conquered Media, and continued to penetrate into the Iranian plateau. In 651, Farrukhzad, the spahbed of Khorasan, and minister of Yazdegerd III, mutinied and left for Tabaristan. On his way to Tabaristan, he met the Arab general Nu'aym ibn Muqarrin near Qazvin, and made peace with him. He then agreed to aid the Arabs against his rival Siyavakhsh, who had murdered his father in 631.

== Battle ==
The combined Ispahbudhan-Arab army engaged in a night battle against Siyavakhsh's army at the foot of the mountain just outside Ray. Farrukhzad led some of Nu'aim's cavalry by a little-known route into the city, from whence they emerged to attack the defenders' rear, causing great slaughter. To set an example, Nu'aym ordered the destruction of the Old Town, which called "al-Atiqah" by the Arabs, (perhaps the aristocratic quarter of Ray). However, the town was later rebuilt by Farrukhzad, whom became the ruler of Ray.

== Sources ==
- Pourshariati, Parvaneh (2008). Decline and Fall of the Sasanian Empire: The Sasanian-Parthian Confederacy and the Arab Conquest of Iran. London and New York: I.B. Tauris. ISBN 978-1-84511-645-3.
