= Mihransitad =

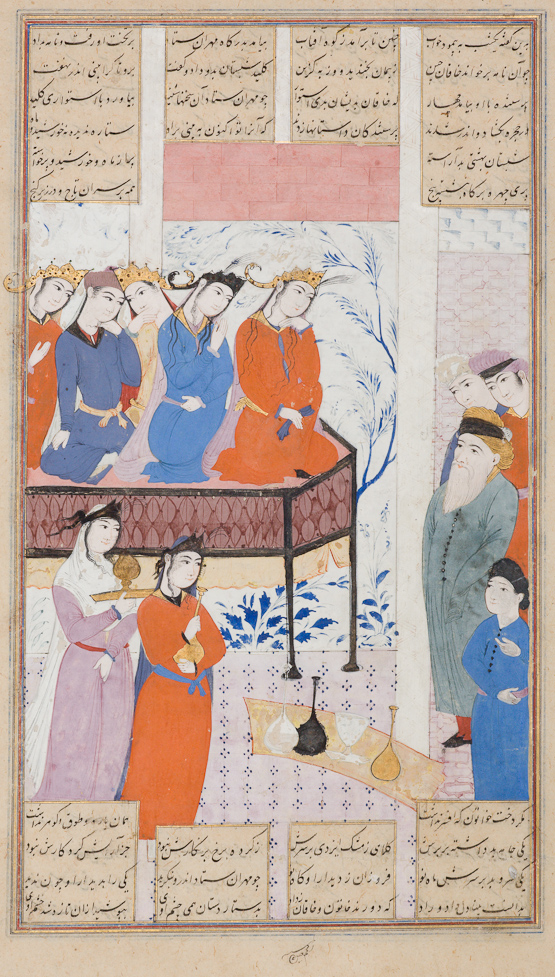
17th-century Shahnameh illustration of Mihransitad selecting a bride for Khosrow I.

Mihransitad (also spelled Mihran Sitad) was an Iranian nobleman from the House of Mihran, who often served as an adviser and diplomat for the Sasanian Empire.

== Biography ==
Mihransitad is first mentioned around 570, when, after king Khosrow's peace treaty with the Turks, he was sent to estimate the quality of the daughter of the Turkic Khan Istämi. According to Armenian sources her name was Kayen while Persian sources states that her name was Qaqim-khaqan. After Mihransitad's visit in Central Asia, Khosrow married Qaqim-khaqan. According to some sources, Hormizd IV, the successor of Khosrow, was the son of the Turkic princess. However, Encyclopædia Iranica states that the marriage with the daughter of the Turkic khaqan is chronologically impossible, and says that Hormizd was born in 540, thirty years before Khosrow's marriage. Mihransitad's son Nastuh later took part in the campaigns of Khosrow against the Byzantines.

Mihransitad is later mentioned as being retired in his hometown Ray and keeping apart from society. In 588, however, the Sasanian Empire was in chaos, and he was summoned by Hormizd IV at the urging of Nastuh. According to Ferdowsi, he told the Sasanian king that the astrologers had predicted that a certain Bahram Chobin would be the savior of Iran. He then suggested that Bahram Chobin should be summoned to the Sasanian court. The aged Mihransitad reportedly immediately died after that.

== Sources ==
- Pourshariati, Parvaneh (2008). Decline and Fall of the Sasanian Empire: The Sasanian-Parthian Confederacy and the Arab Conquest of Iran. London, United Kingdom: I.B. Tauris. ISBN 978-1-84511-645-3.
