= Battle of Waj Rudh =

642 battle

- Part of Islamic conquest of Persia
Date	642/643
Location	Waj Rudh, Hamadan, Persia
Result	Muslim victory

Belligerents
Rashidun Caliphate	Sasanian Empire

Commanders and leaders
Nu'aym ibn Muqrin	Muta †; Farrukhzad; Isfandiyar; Varaztirots †

Strength
Unknown	Unknown

Casualties and losses
Low	Heavy

The Battle of Waj Rudh (Waay Rudha) was fought in 642/643 between the Rashidun Caliphate under Nu'man, and the Sasanian Empire under the Dailamite Muta, the Parthian Farrukhzad and Isfandiyar, and the Armenian Varaztirots. The battle was fought in Waj Rudh, a village in Hamadan. The location was precisely theorized and occurred on a road junction between Hamadan and Qazvin.

The Sasanians were defeated with heavy casualties, which included the deaths of Muta and Varaztirots. According to Tabari, the scale of the battle was said to have rivalled the battle of Nahavand, As according to G. Rex Smith, this means Waj al-Rudh was the greatest calamity of Sassanid after Nahavand and battle of al-Qadisiyyah.

== Sources ==
- Pourshariati, Parvaneh (2008). Decline and Fall of the Sasanian Empire: The Sasanian-Parthian Confederacy and the Arab Conquest of Iran. London and New York: I.B. Tauris. ISBN 978-1-84511-645-3.
