= Adhar Valash =

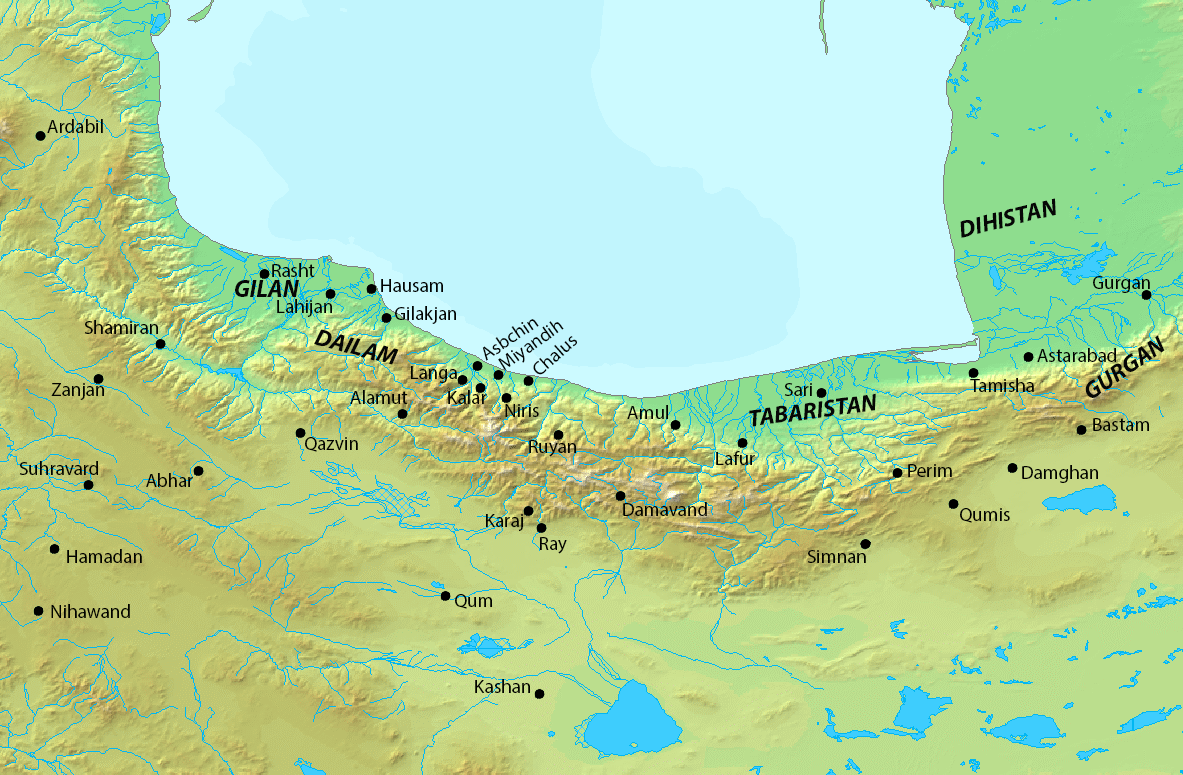
Map of Tabaristan and its neighbouring areas.

Adhar Valash was an Iranian prince from the House of Karen, who ruled Tabaristan and Gurgan under the authority of the last Sasanian emperor Yazdegerd III (r. 632–651).

The name of Adhar Valash is a combination of ādur/ādar ("fire") and the personal name of Walāxš (also spelled Walākhsh). A descendant of the prominent 6th-century statesman Bozorgmehr, Adhar Valash had been given control over the provinces during the Arab conquest of Iran. Not long after, his domain was threatened by the Gil Gavbara, a great-grandson of the 5th-century Sasanian ruler Jamasp (r. 496–498). Adhar Valash requested the aid of Yazdegerd III, who, however, after being informed of Gil Gavbara's Sasanian descent, ordered Adhar Valash to submit to the latter. Some time afterwards, Adhar Valash died during a game of polo after falling from his horse. A grandson of Adhar Valash, also named Valash, ruled Tabaristan from 665 to 673.

== Sources ==
- Pourshariati, Parvaneh (2008). Decline and Fall of the Sasanian Empire: The Sasanian-Parthian Confederacy and the Arab Conquest of Iran. London and New York: I.B. Tauris. ISBN 978-1-84511-645-3.
- Ibn Isfandiyar, Muhammad ibn al-Hasan (1905). An Abridged Translation of the History of Tabaristan, Compiled About A.H. 613 (A.D. 1216). Trans. Edward G. Browne. Leyden: E.J. Brill.
