= Isfandyadh =

7th-century Iranian aristocrat

Isfandyadh (Middle Persian: Spandiyār) was an Iranian aristocrat from the Ispahbudhan family, who was the ruler of the Sasanian province of Adurbadagan. He was the son of the powerful Sasanian general Farrukhzad, who was the brother of Rostam Farrokhzad and the son of Farrukh Hormizd.

== Biography ==
Map of Adurbadagan and its surroundings.

Isfandyadh first appears in 642/643, where he is mentioned as the prince of Adurbadagan, who at the head of a big army along with Muta and Varaztirots, fought the Muslim Arabs at Waj Rudh, a village in Hamadan. However, he along with the Sasanian commanders were defeated. Some years later, in 651, the Arabs invaded Adurbadagan, the domains of Isfandyadh and his brother Bahram. Isfandyadh once again made a stand against the Arabs, where a battle was fought. He was, however, once again defeated and this time captured.

While Isfandyadh was in captivity, he told the Arab general Bukayr ibn Abdallah, that if he sought to conquer Adurbadagan easily and peacefully, he should make peace with him. According to Bal'ami, Isfandyadh is known to have said that: "If you [were to] kill me all of Adurbadagan [will] rise in avenging my blood, and will wage war against you."

The Arab general listened to Isfandyadh's advice and made peace with him. However, Bahram, the brother of Isfandyadh, refused to submit to the Arab forces and kept resisting them. He was, however, shortly defeated by the Arabs, and was forced to flee from Adurbadagan. Nothing more is known about Isfandyadh.

== Family tree ==
Bawi
Shapur
Vinduyih	Vistahm
Farrukh Hormizd	Tiruyih	Vinduyih
Rostam Farrokhzād	Farrukhzad
Shahram	Surkhab I	Isfandyadh	Bahram	Farrukhan

== Sources ==
- Pourshariati, Parvaneh (2008). Decline and Fall of the Sasanian Empire: The Sasanian-Parthian Confederacy and the Arab Conquest of Iran. London and New York: I.B. Tauris. ISBN 978-1-84511-645-3.
