= Mihran Halt railway station =

Railway station in Mehran, Pakistan

General information
- Owner: Ministry of Railways

Other information
- Station code: MINT

History
- Former names: Great Indian Peninsula Railway

Mihran Halt railway station (Urdu: مہران ہالٹ ریلوے اسٹیشن) is located in Pakistan.

== See also ==
- List of railway stations in Pakistan
- Pakistan Railways
