= Valash =

Valash (Middle Persian: Wardākhsh/Walākhsh, Persian: بلاش), was an Iranian prince from the House of Karen, who later became the ruler of Tabaristan in 665.

He was the grandson of the nobleman Adhar Valash, and thus a descendant of Sukhra, a prominent Iranian nobleman who controlled much of the affairs of the Sasanian Empire. In 665, Valash murdered Farrukhzad who was the ruler of Tabaristan, and then conquered his domains, thus becoming the sole ruler of Tabaristan. Farrukhzad's son, Surkhab I, then fled to a Bavand stronghold in Mazandaran to avoid Valash. In 673, Surkhab avenged his father by killing Valash, and then reconquered Tabaristan from Valash.

== Sources ==
- Pourshariati, Parvaneh (2008). Decline and Fall of the Sasanian Empire: The Sasanian-Parthian Confederacy and the Arab Conquest of Iran. London and New York: I.B. Tauris. ISBN 978-1-84511-645-3.
- Chaumont, M. L. (1988). "BALĀŠ". Encyclopaedia Iranica, Vol. III, Fasc. 6. pp. 574–580.

Regnal titles
Preceded by Farrukhzad	Ruler of Tabaristan ca. 665–673	Succeeded by Surkhab I
