= Bukayr ibn Abdallah =

7th-century Arab military leader

Bukayr ibn Abdallah (Arabic: بكير بن عبدالله) was an Arab military leader, who served the Rashidun Caliphate and is known for the conquest of the Sasanian province of Adurbadagan.

== Biography ==
In 651, Bukayr invaded Adurbadagan, which was the domain of the Ispahbudhan brothers Isfandyadh and Bahram. Isfandyadh made a stand against him, where a battle was fought. He was, however, defeated and captured by Bukayr and his men.

While Isfandyadh was in captivity, he told Bukayr, that if he sought to conquer Adurbadagan easily and peacefully, he should make peace with him. According to Bal'ami, Isfandyadh is known to have said that: "If you [were to] kill me all of Azarbayjan [will] rise in avenging my blood, and will wage war against you." Bukayr listened to Isfandyadh's advice and made peace with him. However, Bahram refused to submit to the Arab forces and kept resisting them, but was in the end defeated by Bukayr, and forced to flee from Adurbadagan.

== Sources ==
- Pourshariati, Parvaneh (2008). Decline and Fall of the Sasanian Empire: The Sasanian-Parthian Confederacy and the Arab Conquest of Iran. London and New York: I.B. Tauris. ISBN 978-1-84511-645-3.
