= Bahram Chobin =

Sasanian general and political leader (died 591)

Bahram Chobin 𐭥𐭫𐭧𐭫𐭠𐭭
- King of Kings of Iranians and non-Iranians
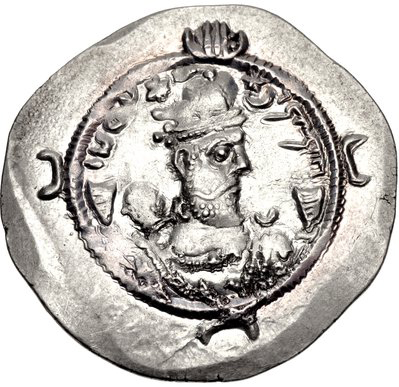
- Drachma of Bahram Chobin, minted at Arrajan in 590.

Shahanshah of the Sasanian Empire
- Reign: 590–591
- Predecessor: Khosrow II
- Successor: Khosrow II (restored)
- Died: 591; Fergana, Western Turkic Khaganate
- Issue: Mihran; Noshrad; Shapur
Regnal name
- Bahram VI
- House: House of Mihran
- Father: Bahram Gushnasp
- Religion: Zoroastrianism

Bahrām Chōbīn or Bahrām Chōbēn (Persian: بهرام چوبین) or Wahrām Chōbēn (died 591), also known by his epithet Mihrbandak ("servant of Mithra"), was a nobleman, general, and political leader of the late Sasanian Empire and briefly its ruler as Bahram VI (Middle Persian: 𐭥𐭫𐭧𐭫𐭠𐭭, r. 590–591).

Son of general Bahram Gushnasp and hailing from the noble House of Mihran, Bahram began his career as the governor of Ray, and was promoted to the army chief (spahbed) of the northwestern portions of the empire after capturing the Byzantine stronghold of Dara, fighting in the war of 572–591. After a massive Hephthalite-Turkic invasion of the eastern Sasanian domains in 588, he was appointed as the spahbed in Khorasan, beginning a campaign that ended in a decisive Iranian victory.

Bahram earned an elevated position in Iran due to his noble descent, character, skills, and accomplishments. The Sasanian king (shah) Hormizd IV (r. 579–590) was already distrustful of Bahram and stripped the increasingly popular general of his commands. Bahram began a rebellion aiming to reestablish the "more rightful" Arsacid Empire, identifying himself with the promised savior of the Zoroastrian faith. Before he had reached the Sasanian capital of Ctesiphon, Hormizd was assassinated in support of his son, Khosrow II, by another anti-Hormizd faction led by the two Ispahbudhan brothers, Vistahm and Vinduyih. As Bahram captured Ctesiphon, Khosrow II fled to the Byzantine Empire, with the assistance of which he launched a campaign against Bahram. Bahram's outnumbered forces were defeated, but he managed to flee to the Western Turkic Khaganate where he was well received. He was assassinated shortly thereafter at the instigation of Khosrow II, who was then the shah.

Bahram Chobin's legacy survived even after the Arab conquest of Iran among Iranian nationalists, as well as in Persian literature.

== Name ==
His theophoric name Bahram is the New Persian form of the Middle Persian Warahrān (also spelled Wahrām), which is derived from the Old Iranian *Vṛθragna. The Avestan equivalent is Verethragna, the name of the god of victory, whilst the Parthian version is *Warθagn. Bahram's surname, Chobin ("Wooden Shaft", "Javelin-like"), was a nickname given to him due to his tall and slender appearance. His appearance was also emphasized by the Persian poet Ferdowsi, who in his Shahnameh described Bahram as a towering and dark-complexioned warrior with black curly hair. The name Bahram Chobin is attested in Georgian as Baram Č‛ubin[i] and in Armenian as Vahram Ch’obin. His first name also appears as Vararanes in Latin and Baram (Βαράμ) and Baramos (Βάραμος) in Greek.

== Background ==
Bahram was a member of the House of Mihran, one of the seven Great Houses of Iran. The family was of Parthian origin, and was centered in Ray, south of Tehran, the capital of present-day Iran. Bahram's father was Bahram Gushnasp, a military officer who had fought the Byzantines and campaigned in Yemen during the reign of Khosrow I (r. 531–579). His grandfather Gurgin Milad had served as the marzban (general of a frontier province, "margrave") of Armenia from 572 to 574. Bahram Chobin had three siblings: a sister, Gordiya, and two brothers, Gorduya and Mardansina. Due to his name, and how the Shahnameh and Sebeos both record him as a Mithra-worshipper, Parvaneh Pourshariati argues that Bahram was likely a worshipper of Mithra.

== Rise ==
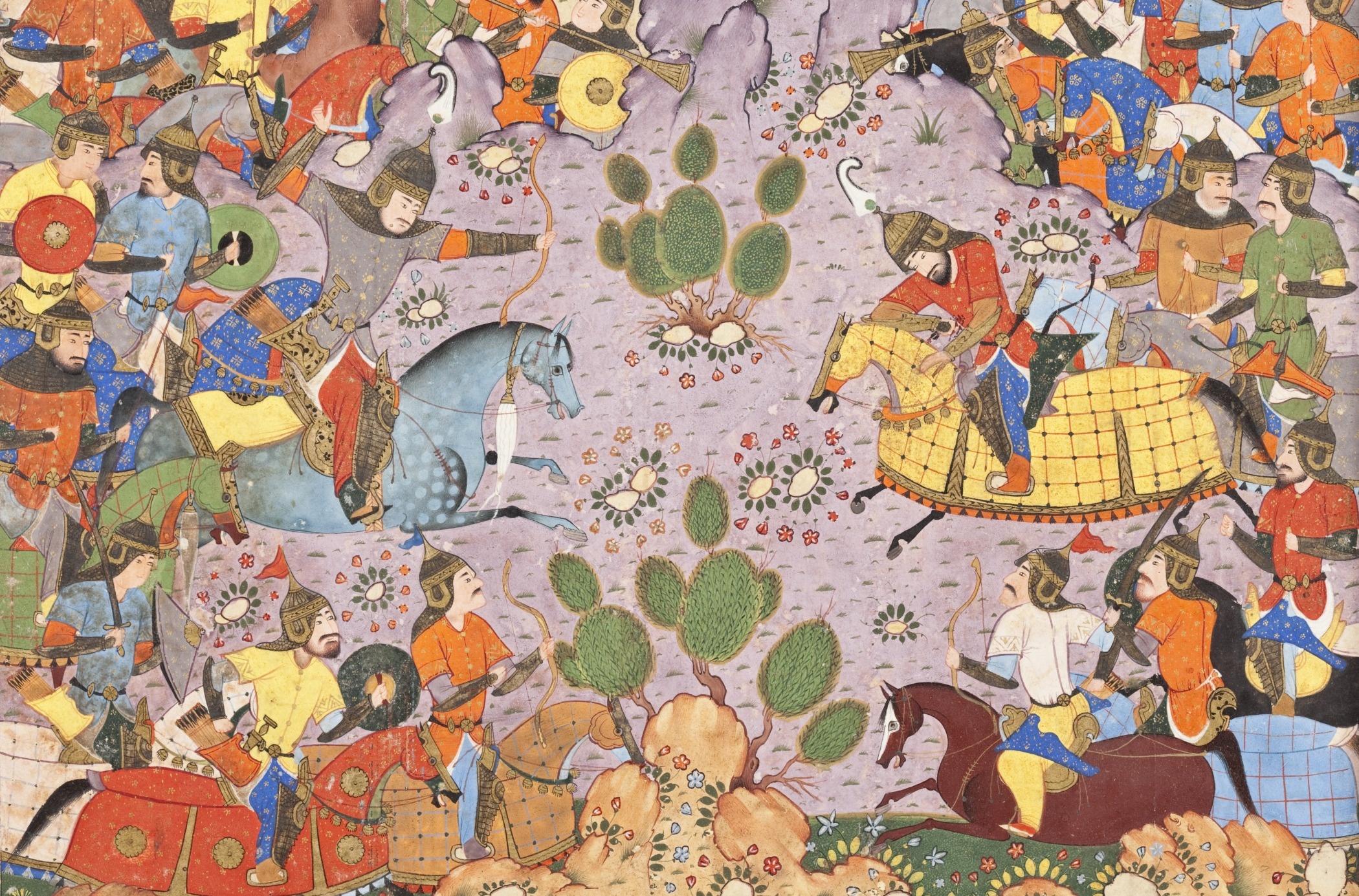
Bahram Chobin fighting Sawa Shah (Bagha Qaghan).

Bahram Chobin originally started his career as marzban of Ray, but in 572 he commanded a cavalry force and took part in the siege and capture of the key Byzantine stronghold of Dara and was promoted to army chief (spahbed) of the "North" (Adurbadagan and Greater Media). After being promoted he fought a long, indecisive campaign in 572–591 against the Byzantines in northern Mesopotamia.

In 588, the Turkic khagan Bagha Qaghan (known as Sabeh/Saba in Persian sources), together with his Hephthalite subjects, invaded the Sasanian territories south of the Oxus, where they attacked and routed the Sasanian soldiers stationed in Balkh, and then proceeded to conquer the city along with Talaqan, Badghis, and Herat. In a council of war, Bahram was chosen to lead an army against them and was given the governorship of Khorasan. Bahram's army supposedly consisted of 12,000 hand-picked horsemen. His army ambushed a large army of Turks and Hephthalites in April 588, at the battle of Hyrcanian rock, and again in 589, re-conquering Balkh, where Bahram captured the Turkic treasury and the golden throne of the Khagan. He then proceeded to cross the Oxus river and won a decisive victory over Turks, personally killing Bagha Qaghan with an arrowshot. He managed to reach as far as Baykand, near Bukhara, and also contain an attack by the son of the deceased Khagan, Birmudha, whom Bahram had captured and sent to the Sasanian capital of Ctesiphon. Birmudha was well received there by the Sasanian king (shah) Hormizd IV, who forty days later had him sent back to Bahram with the order that the Turkic prince should get sent back to Transoxiana. The Sasanians now held suzerainty over the Sogdian cities of Chach and Samarkand, where Hormizd minted coins. (Note: The Sasanians only managed to retain Chach and Samarkand for a few years, until it was re-captured by the Turks, who seemingly also conquered the eastern Sasanian province of Kadagistan.)

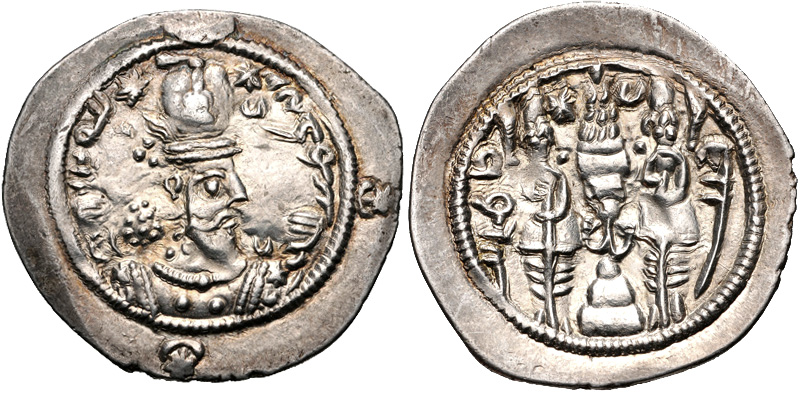
Drachma of the Sasanian king (shah) Hormizd IV (r. 579–590).

Bahram was later made commander of the Sasanian forces against the Byzantines once again, and successfully defeated a Byzantine force in Georgia. However, he afterwards suffered a minor defeat by a Byzantine army on the banks of the Aras. Hormizd, who was jealous of Bahram, used this defeat as an excuse to dismiss him from his office, and had him humiliated.

According to another source, Bahram was the subject of jealousy after his victory against the Turks. Hormizd's minister Azen Gushnasp, who was reportedly jealous of Bahram, accused him of having kept the best part of the booty for himself and only sending a small part to Hormizd. According to other sources, however, it was Birmudha or the courtiers that raised Hormizd's suspicion. Regardless, Hormizd could not tolerate the rising fame of Bahram, and thus had him disgraced and removed from the Sasanian office for supposedly having kept some of the booty for himself. Furthermore, Hormizd also sent him a chain and a spindle to show that he considered him as a lowly slave "as ungrateful as a woman". Enraged, Bahram, who was still in the east, rebelled against Hormizd. The version of Bahram rebelling after his defeat against the Byzantines was supported by Nöldeke in 1879. However, a source found ten years later confirmed Bahram's rebellion in fact took place while he was still in the east.

== Rebellion ==
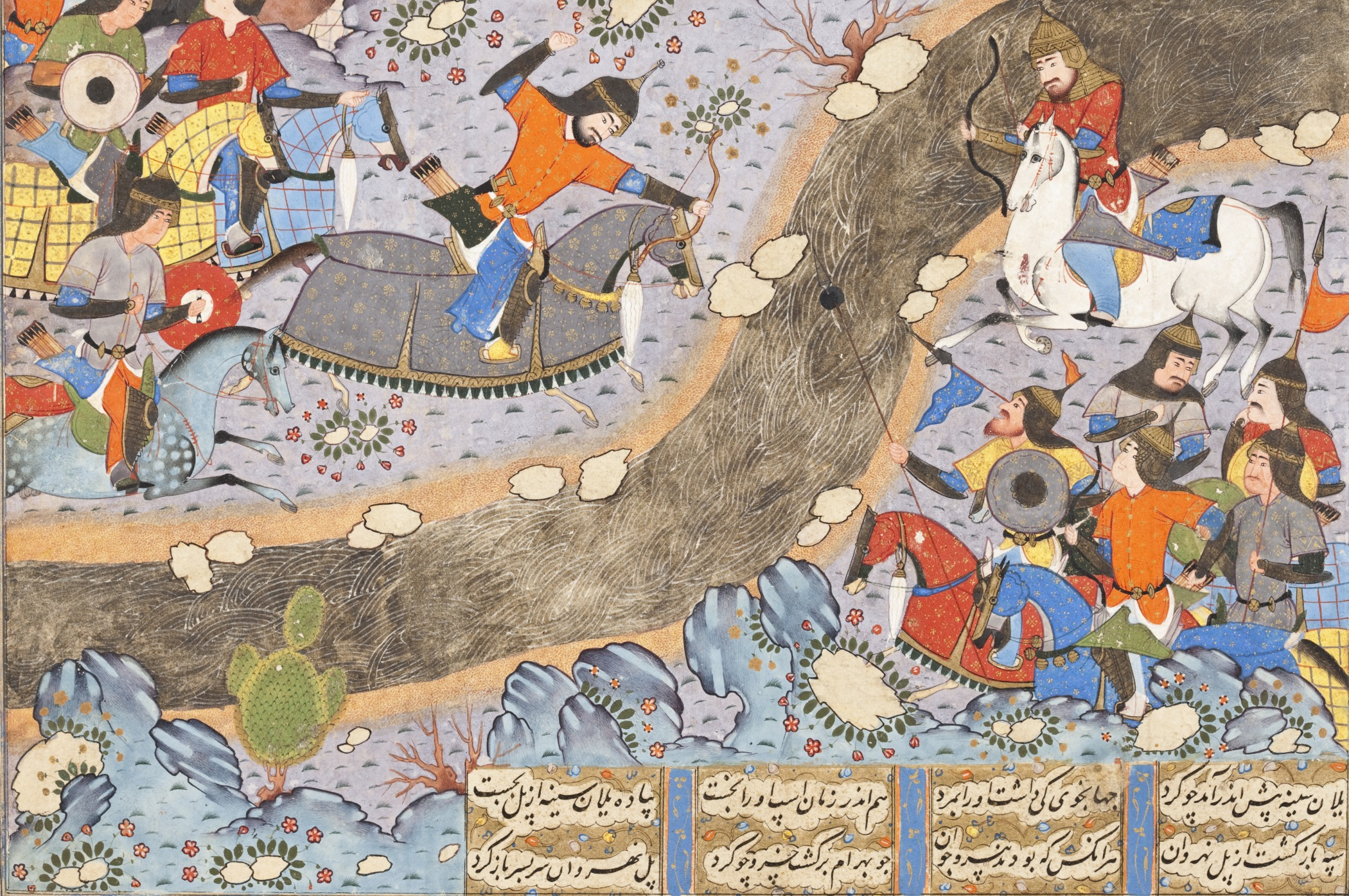
Bahram Chobin's night attack against the Sasanian loyalists at Nahrawan Canal near Ctesiphon.

Bahram, infuriated by Hormizd's actions, responded by rebelling. Due to his noble status and great military knowledge, he was joined by his soldiers and many others. He then appointed a new governor for Khorasan and afterwards set out for Ctesiphon. This marked the first time in Sasanian history that a Parthian dynast challenged the legitimacy of the Sasanian family by rebelling. Azen Gushnasp was sent to suppress the rebellion but was murdered in Hamadan by one of his own men, Zadespras. Another force under Sarames the Elder was also sent to stop Bahram, who defeated him and had him trampled to death by elephants. Meanwhile, Hormizd tried to come to terms with his brothers-in-law Vistahm and Vinduyih, "who equally hated Hormizd". Hormizd shortly had Vinduyih imprisoned, while Vistahm managed to flee from the court. After a short period of time, a palace coup by the two brothers occurred in Ctesiphon, which resulted in the blinding of Hormizd and the accession of the latter's oldest son Khosrow II (who was their nephew through his mother's side). The two brothers shortly had Hormizd killed. Nevertheless, Bahram continued his march to Ctesiphon, now with the pretext of claiming to avenge Hormizd.

Khosrow then took a carrot and stick attitude, and wrote a message to Bahram, stressing his rightful claim to the Sasanian kingship:

Khosrow, king of kings, ruler over the ruling, lord of the peoples, prince of peace, salvation of men, among gods the good and eternally living man, among men the most esteemed god, the highly illustrious, the victor, the one who rises with the sun and who lends the night his eyesight, the one famed through his ancestors, the king who hates, the benefactor who engaged the Sasanians and saved the Iranians their kingship—to Bahram, the general of the Iranians, our friend.... We have also taken over the royal throne in a lawful manner and have upset no Iranian customs.... We have so firmly decided not to take off the diadem that we even expected to rule over other worlds, if this were possible.... If you wish your welfare, think about what is to be done.

Bahram, however, ignored his warning—a few days later, he reached the Nahrawan Canal near Ctesiphon, where he fought Khosrow's men, who were heavily outnumbered, but managed to hold Bahram's men back in several clashes. However, Khosrow's men eventually began losing their morale and were in the end defeated by Bahram's forces. Khosrow, together with his two uncles, his wives, and a retinue of 30 nobles, thereafter fled to Byzantine territory, while Ctesiphon fell to Bahram. Bahram declared himself king of kings in the summer of 590, asserting that the first Sasanian king Ardashir I (r. 224–242) had usurped the throne of the Arsacids, and that he now was restoring their rule.

== Reign ==
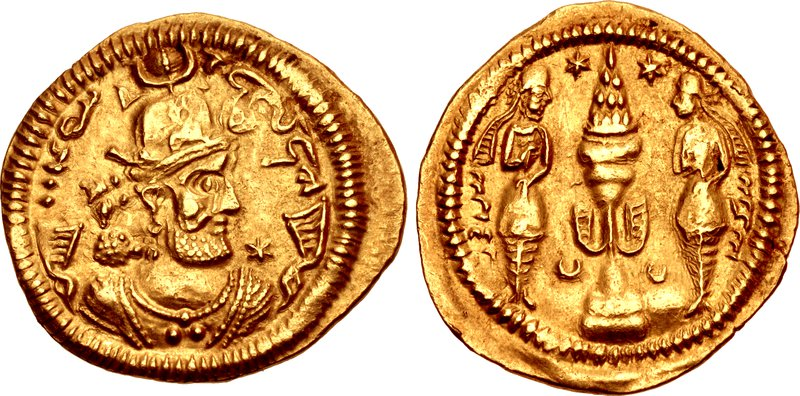
Gold dinar of Bahram Chobin, AYLAN (Susa?) mint.

Bahram tried to support his cause with the Zoroastrian apocalyptic belief that by the end of Zoroaster's millennium, chaos and destructive wars with the Hephthalites/Huns and the Romans would be followed by the appearance of a savior. Indeed, the Sasanians had misidentified Zoroaster's era with that of the Seleucids (312 BC), which put Bahram's life almost at the end of Zoroaster's millennium; he was therefore hailed by many as the promised savior Kay Bahram Varjavand. Bahram was supposed to re-establish the Arsacid Empire and commence a new millennium of dynastic rule. He started minting coins, where he is on the front represented as an exalted figure, bearded and wearing a crenellation-shaped crown with two crescents of the moon, whilst the reverse shows the traditional fire altar flanked by two attendants. Regardless, many nobles and priests still chose to side with the inexperienced and less dominant Khosrow II.

In order to get the attention of the Byzantine emperor Maurice (r. 582–602), Khosrow II went to Syria and sent a message to the Sasanian-occupied city of Martyropolis to stop their resistance against the Byzantines, but to no avail. He then sent a message to Maurice requesting his help to regain the Sasanian throne, to which the Byzantine emperor assented; in return, the Byzantines would regain sovereignty over the cities of Amida, Carrhae, Dara and Martyropolis. Furthermore, Iran was required to stop intervening in the affairs of Iberia and Armenia, effectively ceding control of Lazistan to the Byzantines.

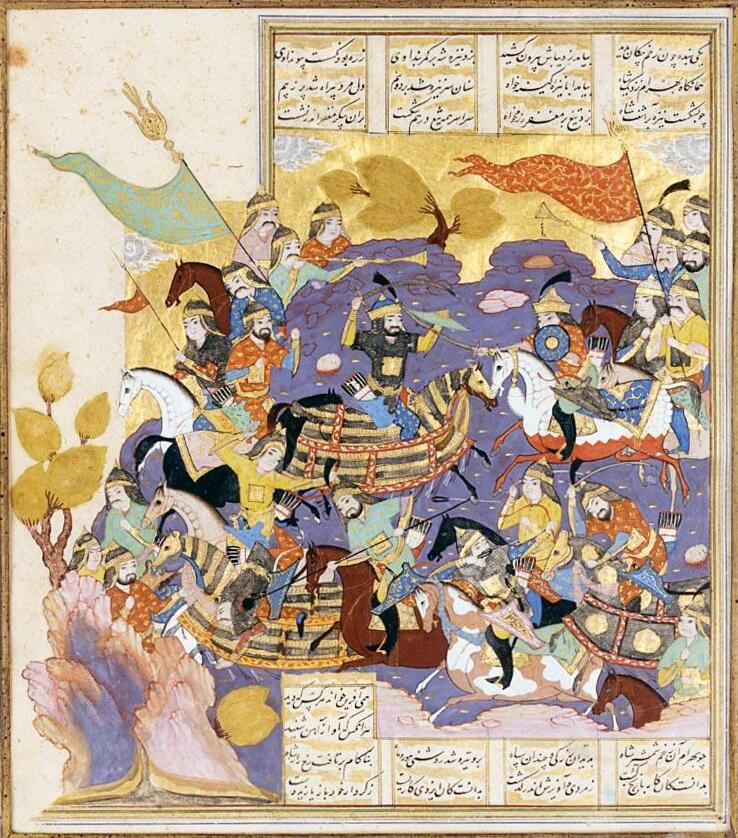
Illustration of the forces of Bahram Chobin and Khosrow II fighting.

In 591, Khosrow moved to Constantia and prepared to invade Bahram's territories in Mesopotamia, while Vistahm and Vinduyih were raising an army in Adurbadagan under the observation of the Byzantine commander John Mystacon, who was also raising an army in Armenia. After some time, Khosrow, along with the Byzantine commander of the south, Comentiolus, invaded Mesopotamia. During this invasion, Nisibis and Martyropolis quickly defected to them, and Bahram's commander Zatsparham was defeated and killed. One of Bahram's other commanders, Bryzacius, was captured in Mosul and had his nose and ears cut off, and was thereafter sent to Khosrow and killed. Khosrow II and the Byzantine general Narses then penetrated deeper into Bahram's territory, seizing Dara and then Mardin in February, where Khosrow was once again proclaimed king. Shortly after this, Khosrow sent one of his Iranian supporters, Mahbodh, to capture Ctesiphon, which he managed to accomplish.

Map of the Roman-Sasanian frontier during Late Antiquity, including the 591 border that was established between the two empires after Khosrow II's victory over Bahram.

At the same time a force of 8,000 Iranians under Vistahm and Vinduyih and 12,000 Armenians under Mushegh II Mamikonian invaded Adurbadagan. Bahram tried to disrupt the force by writing a letter to Mushegh II, which said: "As for you Armenians who demonstrate an unseasonable loyalty, did not the house of Sasan destroy your land and sovereignty? Why otherwise did your fathers rebel and extricate themselves from their service, fighting up until today for your country?" In his letter, Bahram promised that the Armenians would become partners of the new Iranian empire ruled by a Parthian dynasty if he accepted his proposal to betray Khosrow II. Mushegh, however, rejected the offer.

== Flight and death ==
Bahram was then defeated at the Battle of Blarathon, forcing him to flee eastwards with 4,000 men. He marched towards Nishapur, where he defeated a pursuing army as well as an army led by a Karenid nobleman at Qumis. Constantly troubled, he finally arrived in Fergana where he was received honorably by the Khagan of the Turks, who was most likely Birmudha–the same Turkic prince that Bahram had defeated and captured a few years earlier during his wars against the Turks. Bahram entered his service, and was appointed as a commander in the army, achieving further military accomplishments there. Bahram became a highly popular figure after saving the Khagan from a conspiracy instigated by the latter's brother Byghu (conceivably a corruption of yabghu, a Turkic title). Khosrow II, however, could not feel safe as long as Bahram lived, and had him assassinated. The assassination was reportedly achieved through the distribution of presents and bribes to members of the Turkic royal family, notably the queen. What remained of Bahram's supporters went back to northern Iran and joined the rebellion of Vistahm (590/1–596 or 594/5–600).

== Fate of family ==
After Bahram's death, his sister Gordiya travelled to Khorasan, where she married Vistahm, who during that time was also rebelling against Khosrow II. Bahram had three sons: Shapur, Mihran Bahram-i Chobin and Noshrad. Shapur continued to oppose the Sasanians and later joined the Rebellion of Vistahm. After the end of the rebellion, Shapur was executed. Mihran is mentioned in 633 as a general in the Sasanian forces that fought against the Arabs at the Battle of Ayn al-Tamr during the Arab invasion of Iran. His son Siyavakhsh ruled Ray and killed Vinduyih's son Farrukh Hormizd in retribution for the family's role in Bahram's downfall and death. Bahram's last son, Noshrad, was the ancestor of the Samanids, who ruled the eastern Iranian lands of Transoxiana and Khorasan during most of their existence, stressing their ancestry from Bahram.

== Legacy ==
Bahram's life is recorded in the Pahlavi romance Bahrām Chōbīn Nāma ("Book of Bahram Chobin"), which was later translated by Jabalah ibn Salim, and found its way—mixed with a pro-Khosrow II account—into the works of Dinawari, Ferdowsi, and Bal'ami. There are many fables attributed to Bahram VI, as is the norm for many heroes in Persian literature. The chapters in Volume VIII of Ferdowsi's 11th-century Shahnameh on the reigns of Hormizd IV and Khosrow II are both almost as much about Bahram Chobin. In his catalogue Kitab al-Fihrist, Ibn al-Nadim credited Bahram Chobin with a manual of archery. Long after his death in the 8th century, Sunpadh claimed that Abu Muslim had not died but he is with "al-Mahdi" (the Savior) in a "Brazen Hold" (that is, the residence of Bahram in Turkistan), and will return. This shows the persisting popularity of Bahram Chobin among Iranian nationalists. Following the collapse of the Sasanian Empire, the Samanid dynasty, which descended from Bahram Chobin, became one of the first independent Iranian dynasties.

== Family tree ==
Bahram Gushnasp
Mardansina	Unknown	Bahram Chobin	Gorduya	Gordiya
Noshrad	Mihran Bahram-i Chobin	Shapur
Siyavakhsh
Toghmath
Jotman
Saman Khuda

== Sources ==
- Crawford, Peter (2013). The War of the Three Gods: Romans, Persians and the Rise of Islam. Pen and Sword. ISBN 9781848846128.
- Foss, Clive (1975). "The Persians in Asia Minor and the End of Antiquity". The English Historical Review. 90: 721–47. doi:10.1093/ehr/XC.CCCLVII.721.
- Frye, Richard Nelson (1984). The History of Ancient Iran. C.H.Beck. pp. 1–411. ISBN 9783406093975. "The history of ancient iran."
- Greatrex, Geoffrey; Lieu, Samuel N. C. (2002). The Roman Eastern Frontier and the Persian Wars (Part II, 363–630 AD). New York, New York and London, United Kingdom: Routledge (Taylor & Francis). ISBN 0-415-14687-9.
- Howard-Johnston, James (2010). "Ḵosrow II". Encyclopaedia Iranica, Online Edition.
- Jaques, Tony (2007). Dictionary of Battles and Sieges: F-O. Greenwood Publishing Group. pp. 1–1354. ISBN 9780313335389.
- Kia, Mehrdad (2016). The Persian Empire: A Historical Encyclopedia [2 volumes]: A Historical Encyclopedia. ABC-CLIO. ISBN 978-1610693912.
- Litvinsky, B. A.; Dani, Ahmad Hasan (1996). History of Civilizations of Central Asia: The crossroads of civilizations, A.D. 250 to 750. UNESCO. pp. 1–569. ISBN 9789231032110.
- Martindale, J. R.; Jones, A. H. M.; Morris, J. (1971). The Prosopography of the Later Roman Empire: Volume 1, AD 260-395. Cambridge University Press. ISBN 9780521072335.
- Martindale, John Robert; Jones, Arnold Hugh Martin; Morris, J., eds. (1992). The Prosopography of the Later Roman Empire, Volume III: A.D. 527–641. Cambridge, United Kingdom: Cambridge University Press. ISBN 978-0-521-20160-5.
- Oman, Charles (1893). Europe, 476-918, Volume 1. Macmillan.
- Potts, Daniel T. (2014). Nomadism in Iran: From Antiquity to the Modern Era. London and New York: Oxford University Press. pp. 1–558. ISBN 9780199330799.
- Pourshariati, Parvaneh (2008). Decline and Fall of the Sasanian Empire: The Sasanian-Parthian Confederacy and the Arab Conquest of Iran. London and New York: I.B. Tauris. ISBN 978-1-84511-645-3.
- Rapp, Stephen H. (2014). The Sasanian World through Georgian Eyes: Caucasia and the Iranian Commonwealth in Late Antique Georgian Literature. Ashgate Publishing. ISBN 978-1472425522.
- Rawlinson, George (2004). The Seven Great Monarchies of the Ancient Eastern World. Gorgias Press LLC. ISBN 9781593331719.
- Rezakhani, Khodadad (2017). ReOrienting the Sasanians: East Iran in Late Antiquity. Edinburgh University Press. pp. 1–256. ISBN 9781474400305.
- Sebeos (1999). The Armenian History Attributed to Sebeos, Part I: Translation and Notes. Translated, with notes, by R.W. Thomson. Historical commentary by James Howard-Johnston. Assistance from Tim Greenwood. Liverpool University Press. ISBN 0-85323-564-3.
- Shahbazi, A. Sh. (1988). "Bahrām VI Čōbīn". Encyclopaedia Iranica, Vol. III, Fasc. 5. London et al. pp. 514–522.
- Shahbazi, A. Shapur (1989). "Besṭām o Bendōy". Encyclopaedia Iranica, Vol. IV, Fasc. 2. pp. 180–182. Archived from the original on 22 September 2013.
- Shahbazi, A. Shapur (2004). "Hormozd IV". Encyclopaedia Iranica, Vol. XII, Fasc. 5. pp. 466–467.
- Shahbazi, A. Shapur (2005). "Sasanian dynasty". Encyclopaedia Iranica, Online Edition.
- Tafazzoli, A. (1988). "Āzīn Jošnas". Encyclopaedia Iranica, Vol. III, Fasc. 3. p. 260.
- Warren, Soward. Theophylact Simocatta and the Persians (PDF). Sasanika. Archived from the original (PDF) on 2016-10-22.

Bahram Chobin House of Mihran Died: 591
Preceded by Khosrow II	King of Kings of Iran and non-Iran; 590–591	Succeeded by Khosrow II (restored)
