= Adur Gushnasp =

Major Zoroastrian sacred fire

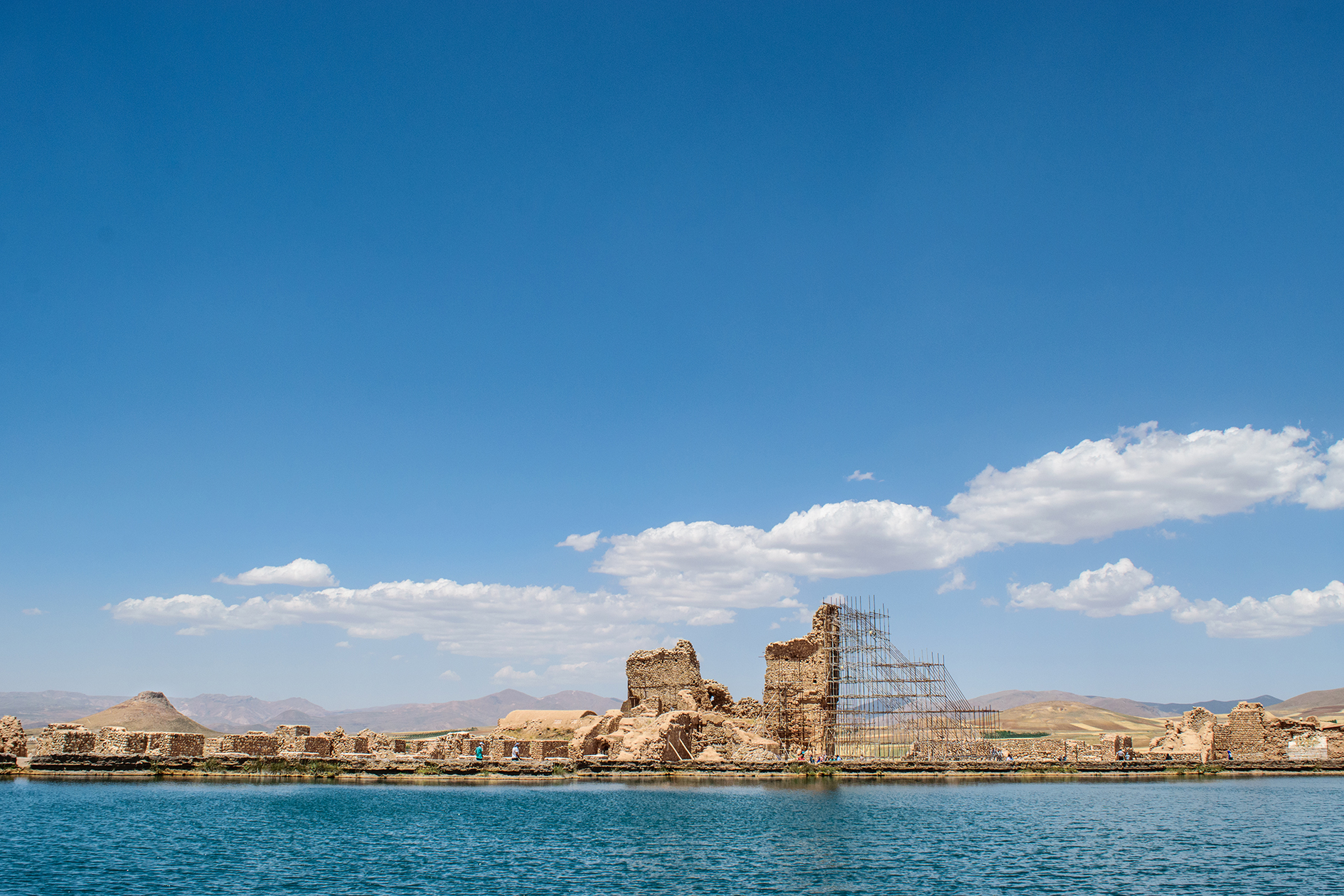
The ruins of Takht-e Soleymān, where the fire of Adur Gushnasp was stored.

Adur Gushnasp (Middle Persian: 𐭠𐭲𐭥𐭫𐭩 𐭦𐭩 𐭢𐭱𐭭𐭮𐭯, romanized: ʾtwly ZY gšnsp Ādur ī Gušnasp; New Persian: آذرگُشنَسپ, romanized: Āzargušnasp) was the name of a Zoroastrian sacred fire of the highest grade (Atash Behram), which served as one of the three most sacred fires of pre-Islamic Iran; the two others being the Adur Farnbag and Adur Burzen-Mihr. Out of the three, Adur Gushnasp is the only fire whose temple structure has been discovered and for which archaeological, sigillographical, and textual evidence are all available.

== History ==
=== Location and purpose ===
The temple, constructed by the Sasanian kings, was located in the city of Shiz in Adurbadagan, now present-day Takht-e Soleymān in the West Azerbaijan province. It served as a prominent site of pilgrimage. The identification of the site of Takht-e Soleyman with that of the fire temple of Adur Gushnasp became clear when a Sasanian era-bullae was discovered there, which had the following engraving "High-priest of the house of the fire of Gushnasp" (mowbed i xanag i Adur i Gushnasp).

=== Origin ===
The fire is not mentioned in early Sasanian sources, and archaeology suggests that the fire was first taken to the site in Adurbadagan in the late 4th or early 5th-century. Under the Sasanians, the fire was linked with the warrior class (arteshtār), which the Sasanian dynasty itself belonged to. In the same fashion as the Arsacids on Adur Burzen-Mihr, the Sasanian kings bestowed gifts on the temple of Adur Gushnasp, the first recorded king being Bahram V (r. 420–438). The latter is mentioned in several instances related to the fire, such as celebrating Nowruz and Sadeh there, and also entrusting the high priest to convert his Indian wife. Khosrow I (r. 531–579) reportedly visited the fire before launching a military expedition.

He also bestowed on the fire temple an extensive amount that was part of the tribute which the Byzantines paid the Sasanians. Kings were not the only ones who made offerings to the fire; according to the Saddar Bundahesh, it is recommended that when praying to reclaim eyesight to swear, "I shall make an eye of gold and send it to Adur Gushnasp" or, in order to make a child become astute and sensible, send a present to the fire. The fire temple of Adur Gushnasp was renowned for its immense amount of wealth in Byzantine and Islamic sources.

=== Sack by the Byzantines ===
The fire temple was sacked in 623/4 by Heraclius during the Byzantine–Sasanian War of 602–628. The Iranians succeeded in saving the fire, which they later restored to the temple, which was quickly rebuilt. The apocalyptical Middle Persian text Zand-i Wahman yasn may report some form of contemporary memory of the destruction of the temple; "They will remove Adur Gushnasp from its place . . . on account of (the devastation of) these armies, Adur Gushnasp will be carried to Padishkhwargar."

=== Decline and fall ===
The fire continued to burn for a long period in the Islamic era, but persecution eventually increased, and by the late 10th-century, or early 11th-century, the fire had most likely been quenched. Not long after, a local Muslim ruler used the remains of the temple to erect a palace on the hilltop.

== Sources ==
- Boyce, M. (1983). "Ādur Gušnasp". Encyclopaedia Iranica, Vol. I, Fasc. 5. pp. 475–476.
- Boyce, Mary (1984). Zoroastrians: Their Religious Beliefs and Practices. Psychology Press. pp. 1–252. ISBN 9780415239028.
- Ghodrat-Dizaji, Mehrdad (2010). "Ādurbādagān during the Late Sasanian Period: A Study in Administrative Geography". Iran: Journal of the British Institute of Persian Studies. 48 (1): 69–80. doi:10.1080/05786967.2010.11864774. S2CID 163839498.
- Kia, Mehrdad (2016). The Persian Empire: A Historical Encyclopedia [2 volumes]: A Historical Encyclopedia. ABC-CLIO. ISBN 978-1610693912.
- Payne, Richard E. (2015). A State of Mixture: Christians, Zoroastrians, and Iranian Political Culture in Late Antiquity. Univ of California Press. pp. 1–320. ISBN 9780520961531.
- Potts, Daniel; Canepa, Matthew (2018). "fires of Iran, great". In Nicholson, Oliver (ed.). The Oxford Dictionary of Late Antiquity. Oxford: Oxford University Press. ISBN 978-0-19-866277-8.
- Pourshariati, Parvaneh (2008). Decline and Fall of the Sasanian Empire: The Sasanian-Parthian Confederacy and the Arab Conquest of Iran. London and New York: I.B. Tauris. ISBN 978-1-84511-645-3.
- Yamamoto, Yumiko (1981). "The Zoroastrian Temple Cult of Fire in Archaeology and Literature (II)". 17. Tokyo University: 67–104.
