= Muta of Daylam =

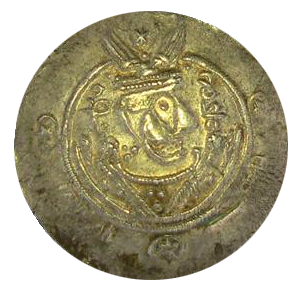

Muta was a 7th-century Daylamite king, who fought against the Arabs in the battle of Waj Rudh. He was, however, defeated and killed by Nu'aym ibn Muqarrin.

== Sources ==
- Wilferd Madelung, Wolfgang Felix (1995). "DEYLAMITES". Encyclopaedia Iranica, Vol. BII, Fasc. 4. pp. 342–347.
- Pourshariati, Parvaneh (2008). Decline and Fall of the Sasanian Empire: The Sasanian-Parthian Confederacy and the Arab Conquest of Iran. London and New York: I.B. Tauris. ISBN 978-1-84511-645-3.
- Al-Tabari, Abu Ja'far Muhammad ibn Jarir (1985–2007). Ehsan Yar-Shater (ed.). The History of Al-Ṭabarī. Vol. 40 vols. Albany, NY: State University of New York Press.
