= Golon Mihran =

Marzban of Persian Armenia
- In office 572–574
- Monarch: Khosrau I
- Preceded by: Vardan III Mamikonian
- Succeeded by: Vardan III Mamikonian

Personal details
- Born: Unknown
- Died: Unknown

Golon Mihran (from Middle Iranian Gōrgōn), also known as Mihran Mihrevandak, was a Sasanian spahbed, and also the marzban of Persian Armenia from 572 to 574. Golon was mentioned by Sebeos as a Sasanian commander in Armenia. He was also a member of the House of Mihran.

== Biography ==
In 572, Vardan III Mamikonian revolted against the marzban Chihor-Vishnasp and killed him. Khosrau I then sent Golon Mihran at the head of an army of twenty thousand men to recapture Armenia, but the latter was defeated in Taron by Vardan Mamikonian, who captured his war elephants as war booty. After his defeat, he advanced towards Caucasian Iberia, where he was once again defeated.

He then invaded Southern Armenia at the head of another army of twenty thousand men along with some war elephants with "the order to exterminate the population of Armenia, to destroy, to kill, to raze the land without mercy." He captured the city of Angl in Bagrevand, what happened after is unknown.

== Descendants ==
Bahram Chobin, the famous Mihranid spahbed and briefly shahanshah, claimed to be the grandson of Golon Mihran.

== Sources ==
- Grousset, René (1947). Histoire de l'Arménie des origines à 1071 (in French). Paris: Payot.
- Pourshariati, Parvaneh (2008). Decline and Fall of the Sasanian Empire: The Sasanian-Parthian Confederacy and the Arab Conquest of Iran. London and New York: I.B. Tauris. ISBN 978-1-84511-645-3.

Preceded by Vardan III Mamikonian	Marzban of Persian Armenia; 572–574	Succeeded by Vardan III Mamikonian
