= Adurbadagan =

Province of the Sasanian Empire

Ādurbādagān Adurbadagan
- Province of the Sasanian Empire
- 226–651
- Map of Adurbadagan and its surroundings in 488–572
- Capital: Ganzak
- Historical era: Late Antiquity
  - Established: 226
  - Annexed by the Rashidun Caliphate: 651
Preceded by	Succeeded by
Atropatene	Rashidun Caliphate
- Today part of: Azerbaijan, Iran

Adurbadagan (Middle Persian: Ādurbādagān/Āδarbāyagān, Parthian: Āturpātākān) was a northwestern province in the Sasanian Empire, mostly overlapping the present-day Azerbaijan region in Iran. Governed by a marzban ("margrave"), it functioned as an important frontier (and later religious) region against the neighbouring country of Armenia. It is also the root word of the modern Iranian "Azerbaijan" region as well as the country of Azerbaijan.

The capital of the province was Ganzak.

== Etymology ==
Ādurbādagān is the Middle Persian spelling of the Parthian Āturpātākān, which is derived from the name of the former satrap of the area, Atropates (Āturpāt). It is attested in Georgian as Adarbadagan and in Armenian as Atrpatakan.

== Geography ==
While Middle Persian texts are vague and incomprehensible about the geography of Adurbadagan, New Persian and Arabic texts are clearer. According to the 9th-century Persian geographer Ibn Khordadbeh, the following cities were part of the province; Ardabil, Bagavan, Balwankirgh, Barza, Barzand, Ghabrawan, Ganzak, Khuy, Kulsarah, Maragha, Marand, Muqan, Shapurkhwast, Sisar, T'awrezh, Nariz, Urmia, Salmas, Shiz, and Warthan (Vardanakert), which he considered the northmost point of Adurbadagan. The southern extent of the province was at the city of Sisar. Maragha was the main city of the western part, while Ardabil was the main city in the eastern part. The Middle Persian geography text Šahrestānīhā ī Ērānšahr mentions a major city in Adurbadagan named "Shahrestan i Adurbadagan", which may have been another name for Ardabil. The capital of the province was Ganzak.

When the Arsacid house of Armenia was abolished and the country was made a Sassanian province in 428, the Armenian districts of Parskahayk and Paytakaran were incorporated into Adurbadagan. The northern extent of Adurbadagan was enlarged in 571 with the inclusion of the Armenian district of Sisanak (Siwnik).

== History ==
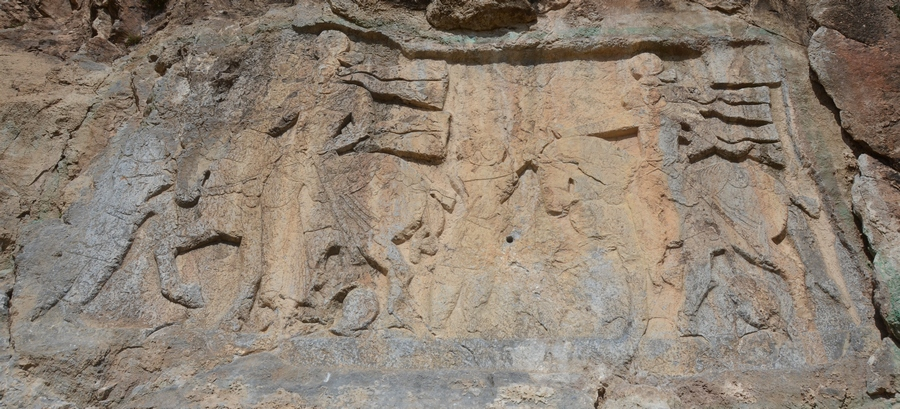
Rock relief of Ardashir I and Shapur I near Salmas

Since c. 323 BC the area of Adurbadagan had been ruled by local dynasties, initially by Atropates and his descendants, and a branch of the Parthian Arsacids from the 1st-century AD. During the late Parthian era, the empire was declining, resulting in the weakening of hold over western Iran. The Iranologist Touraj Daryaee argues that the reign of the Parthian monarch Vologases V (r. 191–208) was "the turning point in Arsacid history, in that the dynasty lost much of its prestige." The people of Adurbadagan (both nobility and peasantry) allied themselves with the Persian Sasanian prince Ardashir I (r. 224–242) during his wars against Vologases V's son and second successor Artabanus IV (r. 216–224). In 226, Adurbadagan submitted with little resistance to Ardashir I after he had defeated and killed Artabanus IV at the Battle of Hormozdgan. Ardashir I and his son and heir Shapur I (r. 240–270) are depicted in a rock relief near Salmas, possibly a testimonial to the Sasanian conquest of Adurbadagan. The nobility of Adurbadagan most likely allied themselves the Sasanians due to a desire for a strong state capable of maintaining order. The priesthood, who may have felt alienated by the easy-going Arsacids, probably also supported the Sasanian family, due to its association with Zoroastrianism.

The events that occurred during the early Sasanian period increased the importance of Adurbadagan. While the Parthian Empire fell in Iran, their collateral line in Armenia prevented Ardashir I from conquering Armenia (or least all of it). Although Armenia was finally conquered by Shapur I in 252, (Note: Historians generally acknowledge that Armenia was conquered in 252 by the Sasanians.) the country would continue to prove problematic for the Sasanians, even more it converted to Christianity. As a result, Adurbadagan had been since the advent of the Sasanians fortified into a military bastion, and then religious one. However, in 241/2, Shapur I had to mount an expedition in Adurbadagan to quell unrest. After that, the province seemingly became completely subdued.

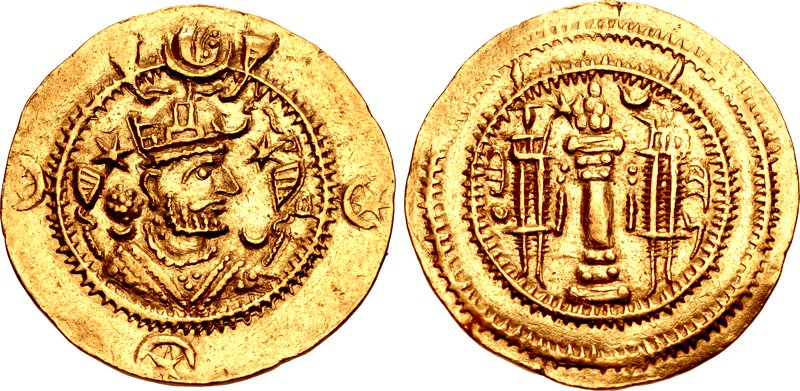
Coin of Kavad I (r. 488–496, 498–531)

Under Kavad I (r. 488–496, 498–531) and his son and successor Khosrow I (r. 531–579) the empire was divided into four frontier regions (kust in Middle Persian), with a military commander (spahbed) in charge of each district. The frontier regions were known as xwarāsān (East), xwarārān (West), nēmrōz (South) and abāxtar (North). Due to negative connotations, the term abāxtar was substituted with the name of Adurbadagan. Due to sharing the same name, the kust of Adurbadagan and its namesake province were often incorrectly seen as being the same in sources. The province of Adurbadagan, along with provinces such as Gilan and Caucasian Albania were part of the northern quarter.

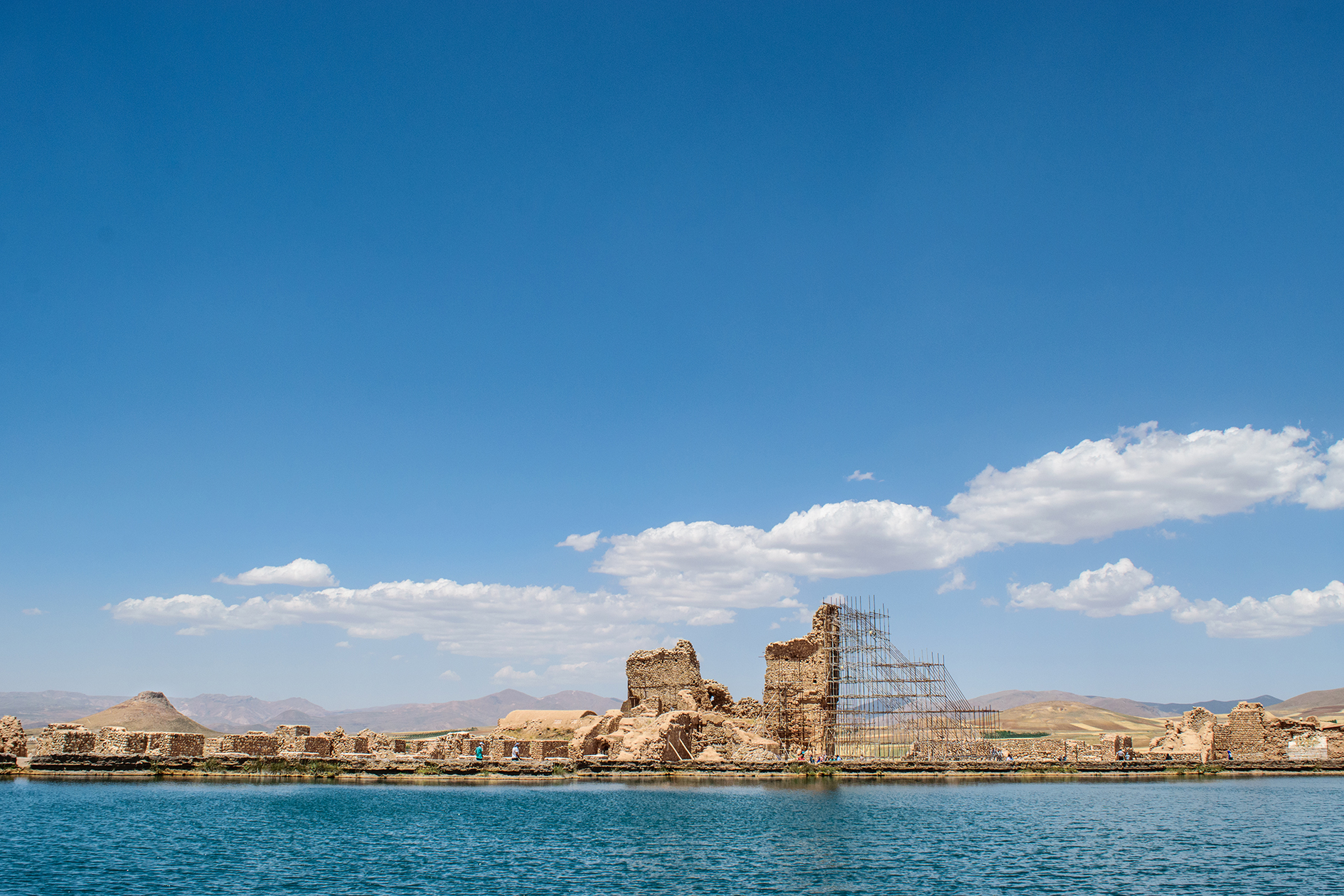
The ruins of Takht-e Soleyman, where the fire of Adur Gushnasp was stored.

In August 591, the Battle of Blarathon took place near Ganzak, between Khosrow II's forces and the rebel forces of Bahram Chobin. However, not long after the battle, Khosrow II's maternal uncle Vistahm rebelled (precise date unknown, 590/1–596 or 594/5–600), and managed to gain control of some parts of Adurbadagan. He was, however, defeated by Khosrow II and the Sasanian general Smbat IV Bagratuni. During the Byzantine–Sasanian War of 602–628, the fire temple of Adur Gushnasp was sacked in 623/4 by the Byzantine emperor Heraclius. The Iranians succeeded in saving the fire, which they later restored to the temple, which was quickly rebuilt. The apocalyptical Middle Persian text Zand-i Wahman yasn may report some form of contemporary memory of the destruction of the temple; "They will remove Adur Gushnasp from its place . . . on account of (the devastation of) these armies, Adur Gushnasp will be carried to Padishkhwargar."

In 651, the Arabs invaded Adurbadagan, which was the domain of the Ispahbudhan brothers Isfandyadh and Bahram. Isfandyadh made a stand against the Arabs, where a battle was fought. He was, however, defeated and captured by the Arabs. While Isfandyadh was in captivity, he told the Arab general Bukayr ibn Abdallah, that if he sought to conquer Adurbadagan easily and peacefully, he should make peace with him. According to Bal'ami, Isfandyadh is known to have said that: "If you [were to] kill me all of Adurbadagan [will] rise in avenging my blood, and will wage war against you." The Arab general accepted Isfandyadh's advice and made peace with him. However, Bahram, the brother of Isfandyadh, refused to submit to the Arab forces and kept resisting them. Although he was quickly defeated by the Arabs, and was forced to flee from Adurbadagan. Adurbadagan thus came under Arab suzerainty.

== Population ==
The majority of the population in Adurbadagan were Western-Iranian ethnic groups who practised Zoroastrianism, and spoke Adhari (including its dialect Tati). With the incorporation of Armenian districts in 428 and 527, Adurbadagan also had an Armenian population.

== Sources ==
- Axworthy, Michael (2008). A History of Iran: Empire of the Mind. New York: Basic Books. pp. 1–368. ISBN 978-0-465-00888-9.
- Boyce, M. (1983). "Ādur Gušnasp". In Yarshater, Ehsan (ed.). Encyclopædia Iranica. Vol. I/5: Adat–Afghanistan. London and New York: Routledge & Kegan Paul. pp. 475–476. ISBN 978-0-71009-094-2.
- Boyce, Mary (1984). Zoroastrians: Their Religious Beliefs and Practices. Psychology Press. pp. 1–252. ISBN 9780415239028.
- Boyce, Mary (2000). "Ganzak". In Yarshater, Ehsan (ed.). Encyclopædia Iranica. Vol. X/3: Fruit–Gāvbāzī. London and New York: Routledge & Kegan Paul. pp. 289–290. ISBN 978-0-933273-47-4.
- Chaumont, M. L. (1987). "Atropates". In Yarshater, Ehsan (ed.). Encyclopædia Iranica. Vol. III/1: Ātaš–Awāʾel al-Maqālāt. London and New York: Routledge & Kegan Paul. pp. 17–18. ISBN 978-0-71009-113-0.
- Daryaee, Touraj (2010). "Ardashir and the Sasanians' Rise to Power". Anabasis: Studia Classical et Orientalia. 1. University of California: 236–255.
- Daryaee, Touraj (2014). Sasanian Persia: The Rise and Fall of an Empire. I.B.Tauris. pp. 1–240. ISBN 978-0857716668.
- de Planhol, X. (1987). "Azerbaijan i. Geography". In Yarshater, Ehsan (ed.). Encyclopædia Iranica. Vol. III/2: Awāʾel al-maqālāt–Azerbaijan IV. London and New York: Routledge & Kegan Paul. pp. 205–215. ISBN 978-0-71009-114-7.
- Ghodrat-Dizaji, Mehrdad (2007). "Administrative Geography of the Early Sasanian Period: The Case of Ādurbādagān". Iran: Journal of the British Institute of Persian Studies. 45 (1): 87–93. doi:10.1080/05786967.2007.11864720. S2CID 133088896.
- Ghodrat-Dizaji, Mehrdad (2010). "Ādurbādagān during the Late Sasanian Period: A Study in Administrative Geography". Iran: Journal of the British Institute of Persian Studies. 48 (1): 69–80. doi:10.1080/05786967.2010.11864774. S2CID 163839498.
- Ghodrat-Dizaji, Mehrdad (2011). "Disintegration of Sasanian Hegemony over Northern Iran". Iranica Antiqua. 46: 153–302. doi:10.2143/IA.46.0.2084424.
- Gregoratti, Leonardo (2017). "The Arsacid Empire". In Daryaee, Touraj (ed.). King of the Seven Climes: A History of the Ancient Iranian World (3000 BCE - 651 CE). UCI Jordan Center for Persian Studies. pp. 1–236. ISBN 9780692864401.
- Olbrycht, Marek Jan (2014). "The Genealogy of Artabanos II (AD 8/9–39/40), King of Parthia". Miscellanea Anthropologica et Sociologica. 15 (3): 92–97. doi:10.5604/20842937.1134333.
- Schippmann, K. (1987). "Azerbaijan iii. Pre-Islamic History". In Yarshater, Ehsan (ed.). Encyclopædia Iranica. Vol. III/2: Awāʾel al-maqālāt–Azerbaijan IV. London and New York: Routledge & Kegan Paul. pp. 221–224. ISBN 978-0-71009-114-7.
- Shahbazi, A. Shapur (1989). "Besṭām o Bendōy". In Yarshater, Ehsan (ed.). Encyclopædia Iranica. Vol. IV/2: Behruz–Bibliographies II. London and New York: Routledge & Kegan Paul. pp. 180–182. ISBN 978-0-71009-125-3.
- Greatrex, Geoffrey; Lieu, Samuel N. C. (2002). The Roman Eastern Frontier and the Persian Wars (Part II, 363–630 AD). New York, New York and London, United Kingdom: Routledge (Taylor & Francis). ISBN 0-415-14687-9.
- Pourshariati, Parvaneh (2008). Decline and Fall of the Sasanian Empire: The Sasanian-Parthian Confederacy and the Arab Conquest of Iran. London and New York: I.B. Tauris. ISBN 978-1-84511-645-3.
- Rapp, Stephen H. (2014). The Sasanian World through Georgian Eyes: Caucasia and the Iranian Commonwealth in Late Antique Georgian Literature. Routledge. ISBN 978-1472425522.
- Shahinyan, Arsen (2016). "Northern Territories of the Sasanian Atropatene and the Arab Azerbaijan". Iran and the Caucasus. 20 (2): 191–203. doi:10.1163/1573384X-20160203.
- Shayegan, M. Rahim (2004). "Hormozd I". In Yarshater, Ehsan (ed.). Encyclopædia Iranica. Vol. XII/5: Homosexuality III–Human migration II. London and New York: Routledge & Kegan Paul. pp. 462–464. ISBN 978-0-933273-79-5.
- Yamamoto, Yumiko (1981). "The Zoroastrian Temple Cult of Fire in Archaeology and Literature (II)". Orient. 17. Tokyo University: 67–104. doi:10.5356/orient1960.17.67.
