= Mardansina =

Iranian 6th century nobleman

Mardansina (also spelled Mardan Sina) was a nobleman from the House of Mihran, one of the Seven Great Houses of the Sasanian Iranian Empire. He was the son of Bahram Gushnasp and thus the brother of the prominent Sasanian military leader Bahram Chobin, who managed to overthrow the Sasanian king himself briefly in 590–591, but was eventually defeated and killed. Mardansina thereafter became the new leader of the rebel movement of Bahram Chobin, and later took part in the rebellion of Vistahm (591–596 or 594/5–600).

== Sources ==
- Shahbazi, A. Sh. (1988). "BAHRĀM (2)". Encyclopaedia Iranica, Vol. III, Fasc. 5. pp. 514–522.
