= Bahram Gushnasp =

Bahram Gushnasp, known in Byzantine sources as Bargousnas, was an Iranian military officer from the House of Mihran.

He is first mentioned at an unknown date, when he campaigned against the Himyarites, and was quite successful; he managed to capture the Himyarite king Sanatources, sack his capital and take many captives. He is later mentioned in 573, as the head of the Sasanian garrison in the important city of Nisibis, when it was besieged by the Byzantine general Marcian. With the help of several other tribes, Bahram Gushnasp fought Marcian at Sargathon, a place near Nisibis. He was, however, defeated and is not mentioned in any source after that.

It is known that he had several children, including his sons Mardansina, Gorduya, and daughter Gordiya. His most famous child was Bahram Chobin, who would later occupy high offices in the Sasanian state, and even manage to overthrow the Sasanian king himself in 590–591.

== Sources ==
- Martindale, John Robert; Jones, Arnold Hugh Martin; Morris, J., eds. (1992). The Prosopography of the Later Roman Empire, Volume III: A.D. 527–641. Cambridge, United Kingdom: Cambridge University Press. ISBN 978-0-521-20160-5.
- Greatrex, Geoffrey; Lieu, Samuel N. C. (2002). The Roman Eastern Frontier and the Persian Wars (Part II, 363–630 AD). New York, New York and London, United Kingdom: Routledge (Taylor & Francis). ISBN 0-415-14687-9.
