= House of Ispahbudhan =

Parthian clan

- Parent house: House of Koshm, House of Arsaces
- Country: Parthian Empire, Sasanian Empire
- Founder: Aspahpet Pahlav
- Current head: None, extinct
- Titles: Spahbed
- Members: Farrukh Hormizd, Rostam Farrokhzad, Farrukhzad
- Estates: Khorasan, Gurgan, Adurbadagan
- Cadet branches: Bavand dynasty

The House of Ispahbudhan or the House of Aspahbadh was one of the Seven Great Houses of the Sasanian Empire. Like the Sasanian dynasty, they claimed descent from the Achaemenid dynasty. They also claimed descent from the legendary Kayanian figure Esfandiyār, who was the son of Vishtaspa, who according to Zoroastrian sources was one of Zoroaster's early followers.

== Origin and ancestry ==
The family traced its descent back to military marshals (spahbeds) and occupied important offices in the realm. According to a romanticized legend about their origin, a daughter of the Parthian emperor Phraates IV (r. 37–2 BC), named Koshm, married a "general of all Iranians"; their offspring bore the title of "Aspahpet Pahlav", later forming the Ispahbudhan clan. Through their Arsacid lineage, the Ispahbudhan claimed to be descendants of the Kayanian kings Dara II and Esfandiyār.

== History ==
Under the Sasanians, the Ispahbudhan enjoyed such a high status that they were acknowledged as "kin and partners of the Sasanians". Although the hereditary homeland of the Ispahbudhan seems to have been Khorasan, the family over time came to rule the northwestern quarter (kust) of Adurbadagan (not to be confused with the namesake province of Adurbadagan). The family included many powerful men in the Sasanian Empire closely related to the House of Sasan such as Farrukh Hormizd, Farrukhzad, Rostam Farrokhzad, Vistahm, Isfandyadh etc.

=== Resistance against the Arabs ===
In 651, the Muslims invaded Adurbadagan, which was the domain of the Ispahbudhan brothers Isfandyadh and Bahram. Isfandyadh made a stand against the Arabs, where a battle was fought. He was, however, defeated and captured by the Arabs. While Isfandyadh was in captivity, he told the Arab general Bukayr ibn Abdallah, that if he sought to conquer Adurbadagan quickly and peacefully, he should make peace with him. According to Bal'ami, Isfandyadh is known to have said that: "If you [were to] kill me all of Adurbadagan [will] rise in avenging my blood, and will wage war against you." The Arab general accepted Isfandyadh's advice and made peace with him. However, Bahram, the brother of Isfandyadh, refused to submit to the Arab forces and kept resisting them. However, he was quickly defeated and forced to flee from Adurbadagan. Adurbadagan thus came under Arab suzerainty.

== See also ==
- Ispahbads of Gilan

== Sources ==
- Shahbazi, A. Shapur (1989). "Besṭām o Bendōy". Encyclopaedia Iranica, Vol. IV, Fasc. 2. pp. 180–182.
- Lewental, D. Gershon (2017b). "Rostam b. Farroḵ-Hormozd". Encyclopaedia Iranica.
- Howard-Johnston, James (2010). "ḴOSROW II". Encyclopaedia Iranica, Online Edition.
- Shapur Shahbazi, Alireza (1989). "BESṬĀM O BENDŌY". In Yarshater, Ehsan (ed.). Encyclopaedia Iranica, Vol. IV, Fasc. 2. London et al.: Routledge & Kegan Paul. pp. 180–182. ISBN 1-56859-007-5.
- Pourshariati, Parvaneh (2008). Decline and Fall of the Sasanian Empire: The Sasanian-Parthian Confederacy and the Arab Conquest of Iran. London and New York: I.B. Tauris. ISBN 978-1-84511-645-3.
- Shapur Shahbazi, A. (2002). "GOŠTĀSP". Encyclopaedia Iranica, Vol. XI, Fasc. 2. pp. 171–176.
