= House of Mihran =

Persian noble family

- Parent house: Arsacids (claim)
- Country: Parthian Empire, Sasanian Empire
- Current head: None, extinct
- Titles: Mihran
- Members: Perozes, Golon Mihran, Bahram Chobin, Shapur Mihran, Mihransitad, Shahrwaraz, Izadgushasp
- Estate: Ray
- Cadet branches: Mihranids; Chosroids; Samanid dynasty (Samanid claim)

The House of Mihrān or House of Mehrān (Middle Persian: 𐭬𐭨𐭥𐭠𐭭; New Persian: مهران), was a leading Iranian noble family (šahrdārān), one of the Seven Great Houses of the Sasanian Iranian Empire which claimed descent from the earlier Arsacid dynasty. Branches of the family formed the Mihranid line of the kings of Caucasian Albania and the Chosroid Dynasty of Kartli.

== History ==
The name "Mihran" is derived from the name of the deity Mithra. First mentioned in a mid-3rd-century CE trilingual inscription at the Ka'ba-i Zartosht, concerning the political, military, and religious activities of Shapur I, the second Sassanid king of Iran, the family remained the hereditary "margraves" of Ray throughout the Sassanid period. Several members of the family served as generals in the Roman–Persian Wars, where they are mentioned simply as Mihran or Μιρράνης, mirranēs, in Greek sources. Indeed, Procopius, in his History of the Wars, holds that the family name Mihran is a title equivalent to General.

Notable generals from the Mihran clan included: Shapur Mihran, who served as the marzban of Persian Armenia briefly in 482, Perozes, the Persian commander-in-chief during the Anastasian War and the Battle of Dara, Mihransitad, a diplomat of Khosrow I, Golon Mihran, who fought against the Byzantines in Armenia in 572–573, and Bahram Chobin, who led a coup against Khosrau II and briefly usurped the crown from 590 to 591, and Shahrwaraz, a commander of the last Roman-Persian war and a usurper.

In the course of the 4th century, the purported branches of this family acquired the crowns of three Caucasian polities: Iberia (Chosroids), Gogarene and Caucasian Albania/Gardman (Mihranids).

The much later Samanid dynasty that ruled most of Iran in the 9th and 10th centuries claimed descent from Bahrām Chōbin.

== Sources ==
- Dodgeon, Michael H.; Greatrex, Geoffrey; Lieu, Samuel N. C. (2002). The Roman Eastern Frontier and the Persian Wars (Part I, 226–363 AD). Routledge. ISBN 0-415-00342-3.
- Gignoux, Philippe (1986). Iranisches Personennamenbuch II, fasc. 2: Noms propres sassanides en moyen-perse épigraphique (in French). Austrian Academy of Sciences. ISBN 978-3700132080.
- Yarshater, Ehsan (1968). The Cambridge History of Iran, Vol. 3 : The Seleucid, Parthian, and Sasanian periods. Cambridge University Press. ISBN 978-0-521-20092-9.
