= Abbasid conquest of Tabaristan =

758–761 conquest in Iran

- Part of Muslim conquest of Northern Persia
- The map of Tabaristan and its surrounding regions
Date	758–761 CE
Location	Tabaristan and its surroundings
Result	Abbasid victory: Fall of the Dabuyid dynasty and the Masmughans of Damavand; Daylamite uprising suppressed
Territorial changes	Annexation of Tabaristan by the Abbasid Caliphate

Belligerents
Abbasid Caliphate	Dabuyid dynasty Masmughans of Damavand

Commanders and leaders
al-Mahdi; Khazim al-Tamimi; Abu al-Khasib; Rawh ibn Hatim; Umar ibn al-Ala	Ispahbad Khurshid ‡‡

The Abbasid campaign against Tabaristan, or the Abbasid invasion of Tabaristan (141–144 AH / 758–761 CE), was a military campaign launched by the Abbasid Caliphate during the reign of Caliph Al-Mansur. The objective was to subjugate Tabaristan, which was under the rule of the Dabuyid dynasty, a Zoroastrian Iranian dynasty, led by Ispahbad Khurshid. Caliph al-Mansur dispatched his son, Muhammad al-Mahdi, to lead the campaign. Under his command, he assigned Khazim al-Tamimi and Abu al-Khasib, a trusted mawla of al-Mansur, to help in the war effort. The Abbasid forces initially gained entry to Tabaristan in 758 CE, subsequently occupying major cities and compelling Khurshid's temporary submission.

Khurshid abrogated his agreement with the Abbasids in 142 AH / 759 CE, killing all Muslims residing in his territory and mobilizing forces for renewed resistance. al-Mansur responded by dispatching Khazim ibn Khuzayma, Rawh ibn Hatim, and Abu al-Khasib to besiege Khurshid's fortress. The prolonged siege was ultimately resolved through a stratagem devised by Abu al-Khasib, who infiltrated the fortress by pretending to defect. After the fortress was captured and its defenders killed, Khurshid committed suicide by consuming poison from his ring. The conquest was completed by 761 CE with Khurshid's death and the annexation of Tabaristan into the Abbasid Caliphate.

== Background ==
Tabaristan was situated along the southern shores of the Caspian Sea, extending from eastern Qumis northward into mountainous terrain that earned it the designation "land of mountains" due to its numerous peaks and difficult passages. The region's strategic location and challenging geography had historically allowed it to maintain considerable autonomy under Sasanid rule, where it was governed by an official known as the Ispahbad.

The relationship between Tabaristan and the emerging Islamic state began during the early Islamic conquests, when local rulers would periodically negotiate tribute arrangements with Muslim authorities, accepting minimal payments due to the region's geographic inaccessibility. This pattern of alternating submission and resistance continued through the Umayyad period, with the inhabitants frequently honoring agreements intermittently before eventually breaking them entirely during the reign of Marwan II.

Following the establishment of Abbasid rule, the new caliph Abu al-Abbas initially maintained existing arrangements after the local Ispahbad declared his allegiance. The Ispahbad would typically gauge the strength of the Khorasani governor before deciding whether to maintain obedience to the central authority. When al-Mansur assumed the caliphate and demonstrated his power through actions including the execution of Abu Muslim, the Ispahbad Khurshid promptly sent envoys and gifts, formally acknowledging Abbasid sovereignty.

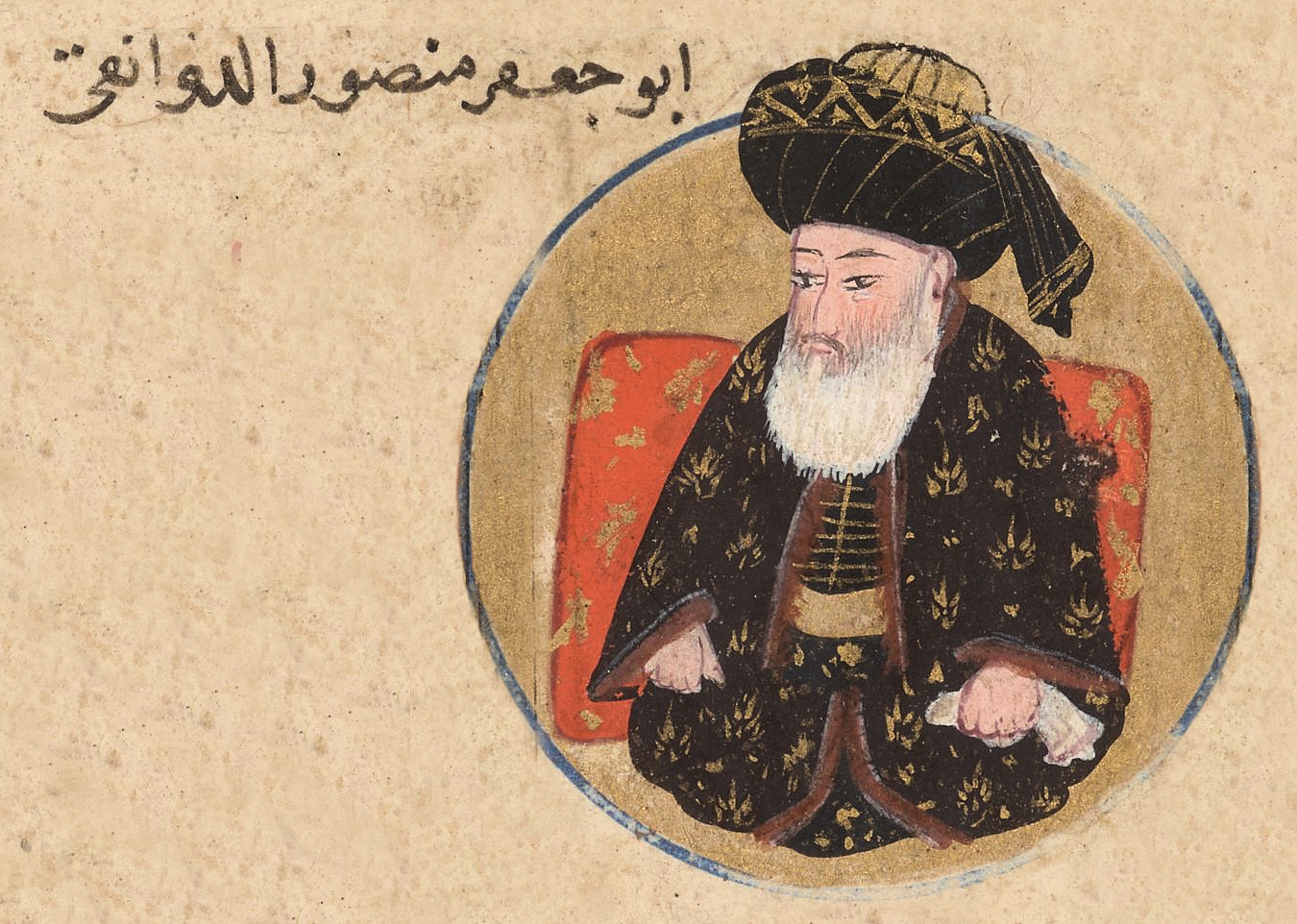
Portrait of the Abbāsid Caliph al-Manṣūr from the genealogy (silsilanāma), "Cream of Histories" (Zübdet-üt Tevarih, 1598)

The tribute arrangement established during this period was substantial, consisting of 700,000 dirhams (each weighing four daniq of pure silver), 300 pieces of green silk clothing and carpets, 300 items of fine colored linen, 300 golden covers, ten loads of incomparable saffron, ten loads of red pomegranate seeds, and ten loads of salted fish, all transported by forty mules, each accompanied by a Turkish slave and a female servant. This tribute represented the same level of taxation that had been paid to the Sasanid kings at the end of their reign.

The region had remained largely unaffected by Islamic religious and cultural influence, with the population maintaining their traditional beliefs and fire temples continuing to operate throughout the territory. By 131 AH (748 CE), when Abu Muslim's forces had reached Ray, Khurshid recognized this new power by offering tribute, though Tabaristan retained its independence. The Masmughans of Damavand refused to provide tribute and successfully repelled initial Abbasid military expeditions against his territory.

The involvement of Tabaristan in broader regional conflicts became evident during the Sunpadh Rebellion, following Abu Muslim's assassination. According to local historical accounts, Sunpadh brought Abu Muslim's treasures to Tabaristan, where he was subsequently killed by Tus, a cousin of the Ispahbad, during a dispute. Tus delivered both Sunpadh's head and the seized property to Khurshid, who then faced Abbasid demands for the confiscated wealth. When al-Mansur persistently requested Abu Muslim's treasures, Khurshid denied possessing them, creating direct tension with the caliphate. Through diplomatic correspondence, Khurshid eventually agreed to pay the yearly kharaj (land tax) of Tabaristan calculated according to late Sassanid period assessments. However, upon witnessing the substantial wealth flowing from the region, al-Mansur's territorial ambitions were inflamed, leading him to devise strategies for direct conquest rather than continued tributary relationships.

== Conquest ==
The conquest of Tabaristan represented a calculated effort by the Abbasid central government to impose direct authority over regions that had previously enjoyed autonomous rule. Following the successful suppression of Abd al-Jabbar al-Azdi's revolt in Khorasan in 142 AH (759-760 CE), Caliph Al-Mansur sought to justify the substantial military expenditures by deploying the unused forces against Tabaristan. The caliph's strategic objectives included incorporating Tabaristan into the Islamic state due to its important location and resources, keeping the Abbasid army occupied after completing its mission in Khurasan, and delivering a stern lesson to the Ispahbad for retaining Abu Muslim's treasures.

With Khorasan relatively stable under the governorship of al-Mahdi in 140 AH (757 CE), al-Mansur directed his attention toward the Caspian region. Al-Mahdi's extended residence at his headquarters in Ray from 140-151 AH (757-768 CE) demonstrated the caliphate's commitment to resolving unrest in the eastern territories and imposing central authority over autonomous regions. The geographic advantages that had previously protected Tabaristan—its mountainous terrain and strategic position—had historically enabled successful resistance against Arab penetration while allowing local princes to exercise considerable influence over the population for centuries.

al-Mansur employed diplomatic deception to achieve his conquest objectives. He instructed his son Al-Mahdi to obtain the Ispahbad's permission for Abbasid military divisions to pass through Tabaristan, claiming they needed to use northern routes to Khorasan because a single road could not accommodate large numbers of troops during a drought year when provisions were scarce. The unsuspecting Khurshid granted permission for the passage, but the Arab forces, commanded by Al-Mansur's mawla Abu al-Khasib Marzuq, Umar ibn al-Ala, and Abu Awn ibn Abdullah, penetrated deep into the province and occupied it instead of merely passing through.

Alternative accounts suggest that a messenger, described as one of the sons of the Ajam, attempted to warn Khurshid of Al-Mansur's deception upon reaching the Ispahbad's court. However, Khurshid remained suspicious of the messenger and refused to grant him an audience, at which point the messenger proclaimed that fate had ordained the destruction of "all this pomp and bounty, together with the kingdom and edifice."

The initial military campaign began when al-Mahdi dispatched forces under Abu al-Khasib and Khazim ibn Khuzayma against the Ispahbad in 141 AH (758 CE). At this time, the Ispahbad was engaged in conflict with the Masmughans of Damavand. When news reached both rulers that Abu al-Khasib had entered Sari, they agreed to cease their mutual hostilities and unite against the common Muslim threat. The Masmughan reportedly told the Ispahbad: "When they come against you, they come against me."

Khurshid had strategically withdrawn his forces and relocated the civilian population to ensure their safety during what he believed would be a simple passage of Arab troops through his territory. However, once he realized the true nature of the invasion, it was too late to mount an effective defense.

Abu al-Khasib conquered Amol, established it as his operational base, and called upon the local population to submit. According to the sources, many inhabitants accepted Islam, allegedly due to previous oppression under Khurshid and to preserve their property and possessions.

The Islamic forces remained in the region for two years and seven months, during which they constructed permanent settlements. Khurshid eventually assembled a force of 50,000 men to confront the occupying army, but the spread of cholera proved to be a decisive factor in his defeat. al-Mansur reinforced the campaign by sending Umar ibn al-Ala, who was considered the most knowledgeable about Tabaristan's geography, along with additional troops under Khazim ibn Khuzayma.

The military operations expanded systematically across the region. Umar ibn al-Ala successfully conquered Ruyan and captured the strategic fortress of al-Taq along with its contents after prolonged fighting. Khazim ibn Khuzayma conducted relentless warfare throughout Tabaristan, inflicting heavy casualties on the local population. Under the pressure of sustained military pressure, the Ispahbad retreated to his citadel and requested clemency in exchange for surrendering the stronghold with all its treasures.

Following this initial submission, Al-Mahdi reported the situation to his father, who dispatched Salih, the sahib al-musalla, with a team to inventory the fortress contents before departing. The Ispahbad then withdrew to the district of Gilan in the province of Daylam, where he remained for two years and seven months while attempting to build a substantial counter-offensive force.

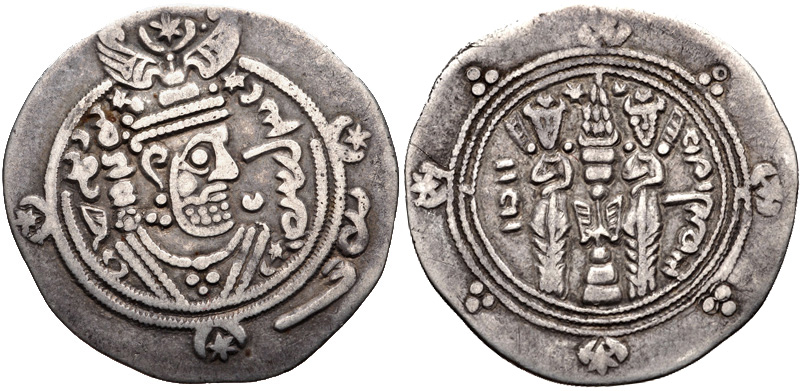
Silver dirham issued by Ispahbad Khurshid

In 142 AH (759 CE), the Ispahbad Khurshid abrogated his agreement with the Muslims and killed all Muslims residing in his territory, prompting a renewed military response. Al-Mansur responded by sending Khazim ibn Khuzayma and Rawh ibn Hatim, along with Abu al-Khasib al-Marzuq, to besiege the Ispahbad's fortress. The siege created a prolonged stalemate, leading Abu al-Khasib to devise an elaborate deception to breach the fortress defenses.

The stratagem involved Abu al-Khasib having his confederates beat him and shave his head and beard before presenting himself to the Ispahbad as a deserter from the Muslim forces. He claimed to have been mistreated by his associates due to suspected sympathies for the Ispahbad, successfully convincing Khurshid to accept him into his inner circle. The fortress gate consisted of a single counterweighted rock operated by the Ispahbad's most trusted associates on a rotating basis.

Abu al-Khasib gradually earned sufficient trust to be included among those responsible for operating the gate mechanism. He then communicated with Rawh ibn Hatim and Khazim ibn Khuzayma by shooting an arrow containing a letter, informing them that his deception had succeeded and designating a specific night when he would open the gate. During the appointed night, the gate was opened for the caliph's forces, who entered the fortress, killed the defending warriors, and took the children captive.

Realizing the hopelessness of his situation, the Ispahbad Khurshid committed suicide by consuming poison from his ring. His family was captured by the Muslim forces, and his remaining supporters were eliminated. The conquest was completed by 144 AH (761 CE), when Khurshid's death was confirmed.

The successful conquest extended beyond Tabaristan proper to encompass much of the southern Caspian provinces. Umar ibn al-Ala also captured Ruyan and advanced westward to take Chalus and other strategic locations, which became Muslim border towns facing Daylam.

The Abbasid forces subsequently moved against the Masmughan ruler and succeeded in capturing him as well. Damavand was also conquered by the Muslims, likely several years after the main campaign.

The caliph had finally achieved his objective of incorporating this strategically important and economically valuable region directly into the Abbasid state, ending centuries of autonomous rule by local princes.

=== Daylamite Uprisings (760-761) ===
The inhabitants of Daylam launched their movement in 143 AH (760 CE) against Abbasid rule. This movement was characterized not merely as political resistance, but as having strong religious motivations aimed at opposing Islamic authority in the region. The conflict thus developed into a struggle between Muslims, regardless of their stance toward Abbasid governance, and their non-Muslim opponents. According to certain accounts, when the Daylamites declared their rebellion, they inflicted severe casualties upon Muslim forces, prompting al-Mansur to declare war upon receiving news of the situation.

al-Mansur responded by dispatching Habib ibn Abdullah to Basra, which was then governed by Ismail ibn Ali, with orders to compile a census of all individuals possessing ten thousand dirhams or more and to require those meeting this criterion to personally participate in the Jihad against Daylam. Similar instructions were sent to Kufa, while letters were written to the inhabitants of Wasit, Mosul, and al–Jazira encouraging them to join the military campaign. The population responded favorably to this call, traveling to the caliphal capital where al-Mansur assembled a substantial military force. He appointed his nephew Muhammad ibn Abi al-Abbas as commander and dispatched the expedition in 144 AH (761 CE) to campaign against Daylam. The forces succeeded in suppressing the movement, and despite the campaign's success and the spoils and captives obtained by the Muslims during the warfare, the military victory did not achieve the desired objective of fully subjugating the region under the Abbasid rule.

== Aftermath ==
Following the conquest, Tabaristan came under the administration of Muslim governors who established their seat of power in Amol. These administrators prioritised consolidating Muslim authority throughout the recently conquered territories. While the local aristocracy was largely spared from persecution, several influential Zoroastrian religious leaders were executed during the initial years of occupation. The third appointed governor, Abu al-Abbas al-Tusi, who served around 146 AH (763 CE), implemented a systematic military settlement policy by deploying garrison forces of varying sizes, from two hundred to one thousand soldiers–across more than forty urban centers and strategically important locations. These military units consisted primarily of Arab and Persian troops, particularly Khorasani loyalists committed to the Abbasid dynasty, and were positioned throughout the region from Tammisha in the eastern territories to Chalus and Kalar in the western areas.

== Source ==
- Omar, Farouk (1967). The 'Abbasid Caliphate, 132/750-170/786. SAOS University of London.
- Madelung, W. (1975). "The Minor Dynasties of Northern Iran". In Frye, R. N. (ed.). The Cambridge History of Iran, Volume 4: From the Arab Invasion to the Saljuqs. Cambridge: Cambridge University Press. pp. 198–249. ISBN 978-0-521-20093-6.
- Omar, Farouk (2009). الخلافة العباسية: عصر القوة والازدهار [The Abbasid Caliphate: The Era of Power and Prosperity] (in Arabic). Vol. 1. Dar Shorouq.
- Pourshariati, Parvaneh (2008). Decline and Fall of the Sasanian Empire: The Sasanian-Parthian Confederacy and the Arab Conquest of Iran. I.B. Tauris. ISBN 978-1-84511-645-3.
- Malek, Hodge M. (2004). The Dābūyid Ispahbads and Early 'Abbāsid Governors of Tabaristān: History and Numismatics. Royal Numismatic Society. ISBN 978-0-901405-83-8.
- Madelung, Wilferd (1993). "DABUYIDS". In Yarshater, Ehsan (ed.). Encyclopædia Iranica. Vol. VI/5: Čūb-bāzī–Daf(f) and Dāyera. London and New York: Routledge & Kegan Paul. pp. 541–544. ISBN 978-1-56859-003-5.
- Rekaya, M. (1986). "Khurshīd". In Bosworth, C. E.; van Donzel, E.; Lewis, B. & Pellat, Ch. (eds.). The Encyclopaedia of Islam, Second Edition. Volume V: Khe–Mahi. Leiden: E. J. Brill. pp. 68–70. ISBN 978-90-04-07819-2.
- al-'Ani, Hasan Fadl (1981). سياسة المنصور أبو جعفر الداخلية والخارجية [Al-Mansur Abu Jaʿfar's domestic and foreign policy] (in Arabic). al-Rashid publishing house.
- McAuliffe, Jane Dammen, ed. (1995). The History of al-Ṭabarī, Volume XXVIII: The ʿAbbāsid Authority Affirmed: The Early Years of al-Mansūr, A.D. 753–763/A.H. 136–145. SUNY Series in Near Eastern Studies. Albany, New York: State University of New York Press. ISBN 978-0-7914-1895-6.
