= Sunpadh Rebellion =

755 AD uprising against the Abbasid Caliphate

- Map of Sunpadh's Rebellion against the Abbasid Caliphate in 137 AH / 755 AD.
Date	137 AH / 755 AD
Location	Khorasan and its surrounding mountains
Result	Abbasid victory

Belligerents
Abbasid Caliphate	Sunpadh Movement; Supported by : Daylamites; Dabuyids of Tabaristan

Commanders and leaders
Jahwar ibn Marar; Omar bin Al-Alaa	Sunpadh X

Strength
10,000	90,000–100,000

Casualties and losses
Unknown	30,000–60,000 killed

The Rebellion of Sunpadh was a Zoroastrian uprising against the Abbasid Caliphate in retaliation for the execution of Abu Muslim al-Khorasani. The rebellion seemed clearly driven by Sunpadh's close connection to Abu Muslim, as he was one of his companions and supporters. He threatened in marching to Mecca and destroy the Kaaba. The rebellion ended up being suppressed by the Arab commander Jahwar ibn Marar al-Ijli. Approximately 30,000 to 60,000 of Sunpadh's followers killed with Sunpadh killed by Jahwar al-Ijli or murdered by the relative of the Dabuyid ruler, Ispahbad Khurshid.

== Background and rebellion ==
In early 755 CE, with an aim to avenge the murder of Abu Muslim, Sunpadh, a nobleman from the village of Ahan or Ahrawanah in the district of Nishapur in Khorasan. Sunpadh was the chief of Nishapur, who was promoted by Abu Muslim to the rank of ispahsalar.

Sunpadh was first in Abu Muslim's army, which he had brought with him when he wanted to perform Hajj in the year 136 AH (753 CE or 754 CE). Abu Muslim had left a part of his army in Ray, along with some of his treasuries. Sunpadh maybe was in the army that encamped in Ray, or maybe Sunpadh remained residing in Nishapur.

=== Religion of Sunpadh ===
Historians differed in their description of the faith of Sunpadh. al-Masudi considered him a Khurramite, while al-Tabari said that he was a Zoroastrian, while Nizam al-Mulk described him as a Mazdakite. According to the modern historian Farouk Omar: "However, if we look closely at the slogans raised by Sunpadh, we notice his attempt to reconcile the principles of Ghali Islam, Khurramism, and Mazdakism. This indicates that Sunpadh spread his propaganda among Islamic and non-Islamic elements, and in order to include them in his movement, he raised different slogans that suited all these groups. For this reason, his slogans were political and religious at the same time. He called on the Khurramites to ally with the "Ghulat ". In his opinion, there was no difference between the teachings of the Ghulat and the teachings of Mazdak. Nizam al-Mulk says that Sunpadh's teachings greatly influenced the Rafida (perhaps he meant the Ghulat Shiites) and the Followers of Mazdak." Sunpadh was identified as a Zoroastrian by the most of modern historians.

=== Beginning of the rebellion ===
The rebellion erupted under Sunpadh's leadership, in Nishapur, driven by his personal allegiance to Abu Muslim, whose assassination served as the catalyst that triggered the rebellion. where Sunpadh propagated messianic beliefs concerning Abu Muslim's fate, asserting that his mentor's death was not final:

Abu Muslim would return from the dead, accompanied by the Mahdi of the Rafidites and Mazdak, to guide us [Sunpadh's followers] to ultimate triumph.

Another motivation for Sunpadh's rebellion was his pursuit of restoring of the ancient Persian religion, Zoroastrianism. while simultaneously pursuing the expulsion of Arab forces from the Persian territories. His opposition to Islam culminated in his stated intention to destroy the Kaaba.

The movement gained support from the Dabuyid ruler, who was known as the ispahbadh of Tabaristan, Khurshid (r. 740–760), as Sunpadh sent a part of Abu Muslim's treasuries to him to support the anti-Abbasid rebellion. Ispahbadh Khurshid whose the domain remained minimally affected by Islamic influence and whose assistance proved essential for the rebellion's early momentum. Rural populations throughout Ray and its vicinity rallied to Sunpadh's movement. The movement attracted supporters from diverse regions including Tabaristan, Daylam, and Jibal. the rebels mostly composed of Khurramites, with rebel forces reportedly reaching between 90,000 and 100,000 participants. However, Historian Farouk Omar suggests these numerical estimates may have been exaggerated. Sunpadh's followers were mostly farmers and peasants.

Sunpadh managed to capture the cities of Nishapur, Ray. Sunpadh defeated and killed the governor of Qumis, Abu 'Ubaid al-Hanafi, and captured the city. He earned the title of "Firuz Ispahbadh" ("the victorious Ispahbadh"). Sunpadh dispatched correspondence to the Daylamite ruler, proclaiming his success in overthrowing Arab dominance in the region. At Ray, he took over the treasures and resources of Abu Muslim that had been left there when Abu Muslim had set out for his intended audience with the Abbasid caliph, al-Saffah, for Hajj in the year 130 AH (747 CE or 748 CE). After he successfully captured Ray, he planned to invade Iraq, he took a large number of Muslims captive, especially women, but he treated the merchants and the owners of the goods kindly, perhaps because he hoped that they would prepare provisions and food for his large number of soldiers.

== Suppression of rebellion ==
=== Abbasid Response ===
As Sunpadh and his followers were moving toward Hamadan, the Abbasid caliph, al-Mansur, responded by dispatching a substantial military force under the command of Jahwar ibn Marrar al-Ijli. The expedition comprised approximately 10,000 troops, including Khorasani forces from Iraq, Arab contingents from western Iran, and additional units from Fars, Khuzistan, Isfahan, and Qom. The Ijli tribe, being the dominant Arab clan in the Jibal region, provided significant support to Jahwar's campaign. As so many Arabs from Jibal joined Jahwar's army under the lead of Omar ibn al-Alaa. Before the decisive engagement, Jahwar addressed his troops to motivate them for the impending battle, framing the conflict in religious and material terms:

You will be fighting people bent on eliminating your religion and expelling you from your world of wealth and power.

— Jahwar ibn Marrar al-Ijli

The decisive confrontation occurred between Hamadhan and Ray at the desert's edge, a battle at Jurjunban. Despite initial resistance, Sunpadh's forces suffered a catastrophic defeat, with approximately 30,000 to 60,000 of his followers reportedly killed during the rout. The aftermath saw the capture of women and children among Sunpadh's supporters as prisoners of war.

Following his military defeat, Sunpadh and his brother attempted to seek sanctuary in Tabaristan. The entire rebellion, from its inception to Sunpadh's death, lasted merely seventy days. According to the historian Ibn Isfandiyar, countless of Abu Muslim's and Sunpadh's supporters were killed in the defeat that their bones were still noticeable in 912.

=== Conflicting accounts of Sunpadh's death ===
Historical sources present divergent narratives regarding Sunpadh's demise, reflecting the complex political circumstances of his final days. While the ispahbad of Tabaristan initially welcomed Sunpadh by dispatching an official to receive him, this hospitality quickly soured as the local ruler feared that harboring the rebel would jeopardize his relations with the Abbasid Caliphate, leading him to orchestrate Sunpadh's assassination after a brief period. The precise circumstances vary among medieval historians: some sources claim Lunan al-Tabari killed Sunpadh in the territory between Tabaristan and Qumis, while according to Nizam al-Mulk, Sunpadh was killed by Jahwar at Ray, and according to Ibn al-Athir, it was the Ispahbad's own agent who carried out the killing. Ibn Isfandiyar provides a notably different account, describing how Jahwar ibn Marrar defeated Sunpadh in battle, after which the rebel fled to Tabaristan with Abu Muslim's treasure, only to be killed by Tus, the ispahbad's cousin, during a quarrel. According to another tradition, both Sunpadh and his brother were slain by a relative of the Tabaristan ruler, who then sent their heads to Jahwar. It is possible, however, that the murder was instigated by the ruler of Tabaristan, Khurshid, in the hope of acquiring the remainder of Abu Muslim's treasure.

A number of Sunpadh's followers continued to remain loyal to him until the fifth century AH (11th century CE) in Ray and Qazvin, where they were known as the "Sunpadhiyya".

== See also ==
- Khurramites
- Rawandiyya
- Abu Muslim
- Babak Khorramdin
- Babak Khorramdin Revolt
- Mazdakism

== Sources ==
- Crone, Patricia (2012). The Nativist Prophets of Early Islamic Iran: Rural Revolt and Local Zoroastrianism. Cambridge University Press. ISBN 9781139510769.
- McAuliffe, Jane Dammen, ed. (1995). The History of al-Ṭabarī, Volume XXVIII: The ʿAbbāsid Authority Affirmed: The Early Years of al-Mansūr, A.D. 753–763/A.H. 136–145. SUNY Series in Near Eastern Studies. Albany, New York: State University of New York Press. ISBN 978-0-7914-1895-6.
- Pourshariati, Parvaneh (2008). Decline and Fall of the Sasanian Empire: The Sasanian-Parthian Confederacy and the Arab Conquest of Iran. London and New York: I.B. Tauris. ISBN 978-1-84511-645-3.
- Kennedy, Hugh (1986). The Early Abbasid Caliphate: A Political History. London: Croom Helm. ISBN 0709931158.
- Madelung, W. (1975). "The Minor Dynasties of Northern Iran". In Frye, R. N. (ed.). The Cambridge History of Iran, Volume 4: From the Arab Invasion to the Saljuqs. Cambridge: Cambridge University Press. pp. 199–200. ISBN 978-0-521-20093-6.
- Omar, Farouk (2009). الخلافة العباسية: عصر القوة والازدهار [The Abbasid Caliphate: The Era of Power and Prosperity] (in Arabic). Vol. 1. Dar Shorouq.
- Douri, Abdulaziz (2006) [1945]. العصر العباسي الأول؛ دراسة في التاريخ السياسي والإداري والمالي [The Early Abbasid Era: A Study in Political, Administrative and Fiscal History] (in Arabic). Centre for Arab Unity Studies.
- Malek, Hodge M. (2004). The Dābūyid Ispahbads and Early 'Abbāsid Governors of Tabaristān: History and Numismatics. Royal Numismatic Society. ISBN 978-0-901405-83-8.
