= Masmughans of Damavand =

Iranian local dynasty (651–760)

Masmughans of Damavand Masmughan-e Damavand
- 651–760
- Capital: Damavand
- Common languages: Middle Persian, Caspian languages
- Religion: Zoroastrianism
- Government: Monarchy
- Masmughan
- Historical era: Middle Ages
  - Muslim conquest of Persia: 651
  - Abbasid conquest: 760
Preceded by	Succeeded by
Sassanid Empire	Abbasid Caliphate

The Masmughans of Damavand (Middle Persian: Masmughan-i Dumbawand, New Persian: مس مغان دماوند, meaning Great Magians of Damavand) were a local dynasty, which ruled Damavand and its surrounding areas from ca. 651 to 760. The founder of the dynasty was a Karenid named Mardanshah of Damavand.

== History ==
The Masmughans of Damavand are first mentioned by Al-Tabari, where the Masmughan Mardanshah of Damavand reportedly aided the Mihranid Siyavakhsh at Ray against the Arabs. The forces of Siyavakhsh and Mardanshah, were, however, defeated. Mardanshah then made peace with the Arabs in return for an annual tribute.

In 748/749, Abu Muslim sought to subdue the Masmughan but his general Musa ibn Kab was ambushed by the local forces who enjoyed the advantage of the terrain, which forced him to return to Ray. In 758/759 due to disputes between Abarwiz and his brother, who is simply called Masmughan in Arabic sources, Abarwiz then went over to the Caliph Al-Mansur who gave him a pension. In some Arabic sources Abarwiz is called Al-Masmughan Malik (malik of the Masmughans), and is known for his bravery.

In 760, Masmughan, the brother of Abarwiz, was at war against his father-in-law, the Dabuyid ispahbadh Khurshid, but when he heard about the Abbasid expedition to Tabaristan, he made peace with the latter. The Arabs then defeated the ispahbadh and the Masmughan, who was captured along with his daughters Bakhtariya and Shakla. One of these daughters became the wife of Al-Mahdi.

== See also ==
- Dabuyid dynasty
- Seven Parthian clans

== Sources ==
- Pourshariati, Parvaneh (2008). Decline and Fall of the Sasanian Empire: The Sasanian-Parthian Confederacy and the Arab Conquest of Iran. London and New York: I.B. Tauris. ISBN 978-1-84511-645-3.
