= Dabuya =

- Ispahbadh of Tabaristan
- Reign: 660-712
- Predecessor: Gil Gavbara
- Successor: Farrukhan the Great
- Died: 712; Tabaristan
- Issue: Farrukhan the Great
- House: Dabuyid dynasty
- Father: Gil Gavbara
- Religion: Zoroastrianism

Dabuya or Dabuyih (Persian: دابویه) was the Dabuyid ruler (ispahbadh) of Tabaristan. He succeeded his father Gil Gavbara in 660 and reigned until his death in 712. His son, Farrukhan the Great succeeded him.

== Sources ==
- Madelung, W. (1975). "The Minor Dynasties of Northern Iran". In Frye, Richard N. (ed.). The Cambridge History of Iran: From the Arab Invasion to the Saljuqs. Vol. 4. Cambridge: Cambridge University Press. pp. 198–249. ISBN 0-521-20093-8.
- Madelung, Wilferd (1993). "DABUYIDS". In Yarshater, Ehsan (ed.). Encyclopaedia Iranica, Vol. VI, Fasc. 5. London et al.: Routledge & Kegan Paul. pp. 541–544. ISBN 1-56859-007-5.
- Pourshariati, Parvaneh (2008). Decline and Fall of the Sasanian Empire: The Sasanian-Parthian Confederacy and the Arab Conquest of Iran. London and New York: I.B. Tauris. ISBN 978-1-84511-645-3.

Dabuya Dabuyid dynasty
Iranian royalty
Preceded by Gil Gavbara as Ispahbadh of Tabaristan	Ispahbadh of Tabaristan; 660-712	Succeeded by Farrukhan the Great as Ispahbadh of Tabaristan
