= Muslim conquest of Northern Persia =

The Muslim Conquest of Northern Iranshahr at the time included Tabaristan, the greater portion of historic Adurbadagan, Armin (Modern day Armenia), Arān (Caucasian Albania), and Wiruzān (In modern-day known as eastern Georgia). Each of these territories fell to Muslims at different times throughout different conquest periods.

== Conquest of Adurbadagan ==
In 651, the Arabs invaded Adurbadagan, which was the domain of the Ispahbudhan brothers Isfandyadh and Bahram. Isfandyadh made a stand against the Arabs, where a battle was fought. He was, however, defeated and captured by the Arabs. While Isfandyadh was in captivity, he told the Arab general Bukayr ibn Abdallah, that if he sought to conquer Adurbadagan easily and peacefully, he should make peace with him. According to Bal'ami, Isfandyadh is known to have said that: "If you [were to] kill me all of Adurbadagan [will] rise in avenging my blood, and will wage war against you." The Arab general accepted Isfandyadh's advice and made peace with him. However, Bahram, the brother of Isfandyadh, refused to submit to the Arab forces and kept resisting them. Although he was quickly defeated by the Arabs, and was forced to flee from Adurbadagan. Adurbadagan thus came under Arab suzerainty.

== Conquest of Armenia and Caucasian Albania ==
The Province of Arān, fell to the Muslim conquest of Iranshahr in the mid-7th century and was incorporated into the Rashidun Caliphate. King Javanshir Arānshah of Arān, the most prominent ruler of Mihranid dynasty, fought against the Arab invasion of caliph Uthman on the side of Sassanid Iranshahr. Facing the threat of the Arab invasion on the south and the Khazar offensive on the north, Javanshir had to recognize the caliph's suzerainty. The Arabs then reunited the territory with Armin (Armenia) under one governor.

== Conquest of Georgia ==
The first Arab incursions in present-day Georgia happened approximately between 642 and 645, during the Muslim conquest of Iranshahr. It soon turned into a full-scale invasion, and Tbilisi was taken in 645. The Emirate of Tbilisi was then established.

== Muslim Campaigns in Tabaristan ==
=== Rashidun incursions in Tabaristan ===
The first Arab incursion in Tabaristan was during the reign of the Rashidun caliph Uthman ibn Affan 30 AH (651 ce.) He sent Sa'id ibn al-As, who entered Gurgan and imposed a tribute on its ruler. From there he marched westward to conquer parts of Tabaristan but he did not achieve anything and was not successful, that was due to the struggle between Ali and Muawiyah for the caliphate.

=== Umayyad and Abbasid campaigns in Tabaristan ===
The Umayyads Launched two campaigns against Tabaristan and did not succeed in conquering Tabaristan. However during the Abbasid era in the reign of al-Mansur, Al-Mansur sent his generals Abu al-Khaṣīb Marzuq and Khazim bin Khuzaymah into Tabaristan, with the intention of completely subduing the country and making it a province.Khurshid of Tabaristan (Ruler of Tabaristan) fled to the fortress of al-Tak in the mountains, where he was besieged in 759–760. Although Khurshid himself escaped to nearby Daylam, the fortress eventually fell, and with it his family fell into the hands of the Abbasids and brought to Baghdad. Soon the Abbasids annexed Tabaristan. In 760 from Daylam, Khursid attempted to invade and restore Tabaristan in 760, but he failed. After learning of his family's capture, he took poison, probably in 761.

== Sources ==
- Madelung, W. (1975). "The Minor Dynasties of Northern Iran". In Frye, R. N. (ed.). The Cambridge History of Iran, Volume 4: From the Arab Invasion to the Saljuqs. Cambridge: Cambridge University Press. pp. 198–249. ISBN 978-0-521-20093-6.
- Pourshariati, Parvaneh (2008). Decline and Fall of the Sasanian Empire: The Sasanian-Parthian Confederacy and the Arab Conquest of Iran. London and New York: I.B. Tauris. ISBN 978-1-84511-645-3.
- Rekaya, M. (1986). "Khurshīd". In Bosworth, C. E.; van Donzel, E.; Lewis, B. & Pellat, Ch. (eds.). The Encyclopaedia of Islam, Second Edition. Volume V: Khe–Mahi. Leiden: E. J. Brill. pp. 68–70. ISBN 978-90-04-07819-2.
- Madelung, Wilfred (1993). "Dabuyids". Encyclopædia Iranica, Vol. VI, online edition, Fasc. 5. New York. pp. 541–544.
- Malek, Hodge M. (2004). The Dābūyid Ispahbads and Early 'Abbāsid Governors of Tabaristān: History and Numismatics. Royal Numismatic Society. ISBN 978-0-901405-83-8.
