= Farrukhan the Great =

- Ispahbadh, Padashwargarshah, Gilgilan
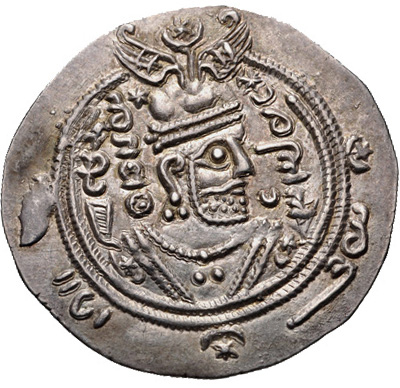
- Portrait of Farrukhan the Great on the obverse of a silver dirham, based on the style of the Sasanian monarch Khosrow II (r. 590–628)

Ispahbadh of the Dabuyid dynasty
- Reign: 712–728
- Predecessor: Dabuya
- Successor: Dadhburzmihr
- Died: 728; Sari, Tabaristan
- Issue: Dadhburzmihr; Farrukhan the Little; Saruya
- House: Dabuyid dynasty
- Father: Dabuya
- Religion: Zoroastrianism

Farrukhan the Great (Persian: فرخان بزرگ, Farrukhan-e Bozorg; fl. 712–728) was the independent ruler (ispahbadh) of Tabaristan in the early 8th century, until his death in 728. He defended his realm from the Umayyad Caliphate, who, under Yazid ibn al-Muhallab were defeated by Farrukhan, who laid ambush to his army. He took the titles Ispadbadh, Padashwargarshah and Gilgilan and defeated a Daylamite revolt to his west. The city of Sari, Iran and the Shahr E-Espohdban were founded under him, and he moved his capital there. He also spent much of his reign fighting the Dabuyid nobility, in which he was successful, and Farrukhan died in 728 with his son Dadhburzmihr succeeding him.

== Background ==
Literary sources are very scarce on the Dabuyid dynasty. They are mainly known through the local histories of Ibn Isfandiyar (fl. early 13th-century) and Zahir al-Din Mar'ashi (d. after 1489), while they only get briefly mentioned by early Islamic-era historians such as Khalifah ibn Khayyat (d. 854), al-Tabari (d. 923), and Ali ibn al-Athir (d. 1233); or by geographers such as Ibn al-Faqih (fl. 10th-century) and Ibn Khurdadbih (d. 912). According to both Ibn Isfandiyar and Mar'ashi, the Dabuyids were descendants of the royal Sasanian family, tracing their descent back to Jamasp.

According to the traditional account, the Dabuyids had established themselves as the autonomous rulers of Tabaristan in the 640s, during the tumults of the Muslim conquest of Persia and the collapse of the Sasanian Empire. They owed only the payment tribute and nominal vassalage to the Muslim caliphate, and managed, despite repeated Muslim attempts at invasion, to maintain their autonomy by exploiting the inaccessible terrain of their country. A more recent interpretation of the sources by P. Pourshariati, however, supports that Farrukhan the Great was the one who actually established the family's rule over Tabaristan, sometime in the 670s.

Although the Dabuyids were the suzerains of Gilan and Daylam, they ruled only in name, with local chieftains and kings being its virtual rulers. This likewise applied to the mountains of Tabaristan, which was ruled by two local dynasties, the Qarinvandids and Bavandids. The Dabuyids only exercised direct rule over Ruyan and the valleys of Tabaristan as far as Tammisha. The neighbouring eastern region of Gurgan was ruled by a marzban (margrave).

== War with yazid ==
Yazid's vast army consisted of three divisions: the Arab division, the Khorasan division, and the Transoxiana division. After conquering Gorgan, Yazid marched toward Sari and encountered Farrukhan the Great near the city, A major battle broke out between the army of Farrukhan the Great and the army of Yazid. Farrukhan ordered a retreat toward the mountains and hills, and Yazid's army pursued them. Upon the arrival of Yazid's forces, Farrukhan the Great ordered his troops to rain down large stones and arrows upon the enemy; Yazid's entire army was destroyed, and Farrukhan the Great emerged victorious, Farrukhan the Great ordered the roads from the city of Sari to the city of Tamisheh to be blocked with trees and stones; he then marched his army against Yazid’s encampment, burned down all the tents, and besieged and captured Yazid, Yazid managed to secure his release from the captivity of Farrukhan the Great by paying 300,000 gold coins, returning all captives, and relinquishing his territory—conditions set by Farrukhan for Yazid's freedom. After releasing Yazid and securing the spoils, captives, and territories Yazid had conquered, Farrukhan the Great returned to Tabaristan and set about developing and further fortifying his realm.

== Reign ==
Map of northern Iran. The borders represent the traditional geographical boundaries of each region

Farrukhan is also known to have had conflicts with the Turks sometime during his reign. He had initially made an agreement with them that they would stop making incursions into Tabaristan in return for tribute. Two years later, after having fortified the passages into Tabaristan, Farrukhan stopped paying tribute. He subsequently withdrew to Firuzabad (near Lafur) where he fortified himself. An invasion by the Turks soon followed, but Farrukhan inflicted a heavy defeat on them at night, killing all of them. Not much later, Farrukhan's Daylamite subjects revolted against him, forcing him to flee to Amul, where he fortified himself in a castle named Firuz-Khusra. The castle was soon besieged by the Daylamites, who hoped to starve Farrukhan and his garrison. Farrukhan ordered the inhabitants to shape clay to look like loaves of bread, and to put them on the walls. The Daylamites, seeing the loaves, became discouraged on the thought of being able to starve out such a well provisioned place, and thus lifted their siege and withdrew to Daylam.

In 716, the Arab governor of Iraq and Khurasan, Yazid ibn al-Muhallab invaded Tabaristan with the intent to conquer it. He was initially successful in his efforts, defeating Farrukhan, while seizing Dihistan and Gurgan. However, Farrukhan soon recruited the Daylamites and Gilites and defeated the Arabs. He then incited the inhabitants of Gurgan to revolt against the Arab garrison. The Arab garrison was subsequently massacred, including fifty members of Yazid's family. Yazid, who had reportedly become desperate, made a treaty with Farrukhan, agreeing to withdraw in return for tribute. The following year (717), the caliph Umar II (r. 717–720) had Yazid dismissed and imprisoned.

== Contributions ==
Regarding the founding of Saruyeh (modern-day Sari), Ibn Isfandiyar wrote that Farrukhan ordered a person named "Bav" to build a city in a rural place called "Ohar". That position was on a high position and had many springs. People bribed Bav to build the city elsewhere. Bav accepted and built a city that is now called Sari. After the construction of the city was completed, Farrukhan the Great went there to visit, and after the "betrayal" of Bav was determined, he was hanged. However, the resulting city was named after one of the sons of Farrukhan, Saruya, and was known as this city for a long time. As in the reign of Shahriyar IV, coins dated 1106 have been struck with the name "Saruya" written on them. Next to the city of Sari, Farrukhan built a palace for himself which was called "Shahr-e Espahbodan" or "Espahbodan". The city of Espahbodan was apparently located between the cities of Sari and Amol, and was also two miles from the sea.

== Coinage ==
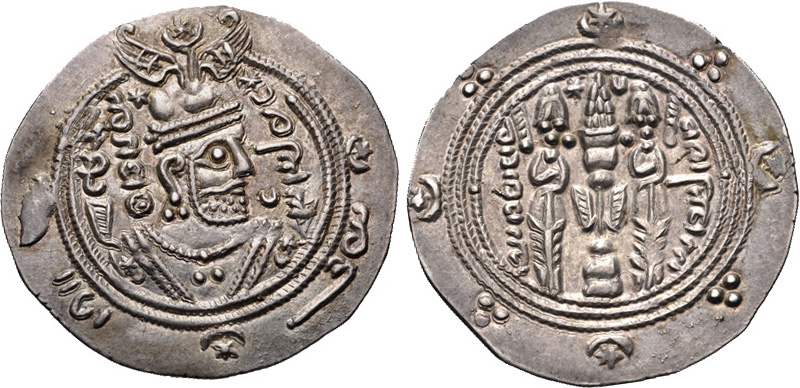
Coin of Farrukhan the Great

Farrukhan is the first Dabuyid ruler whose coins are known. He imitated the coinage of the Sasanian King of Kings (shahanshah) Khosrow II (r. 590–628), albeit with some minor changes. His coins weighed half of the Sasanian coins, being around 2.05 grams. The legend was written in Middle Persian. On the obverse, Farrukhan is wearing a crown with two wings attached to it, which is a reference to Verethragna, the god of victory. The following rulers, Dadhburzmihr and Khurshid (r. 740–760) continued to mint the same pattern of coins, and eventually the Abbasid governors of Tabaristan.

== Issue ==
Farrukhan had 3 sons;

- Dadhburzmihr
- Farrukhan the Little
- Saruya

== Sources ==
- Bosworth, C. E., ed. (1991). The History of al-Ṭabarī, Volume XXXIII: Storm and Stress Along the Northern Frontiers of the ʿAbbāsid Caliphate: The Caliphate of al-Muʿtasim, A.D. 833–842/A.H. 218–227. SUNY Series in Near Eastern Studies. Albany, New York: State University of New York Press. ISBN 978-0-7914-0493-5.
- Madelung, W. (1975). "The Minor Dynasties of Northern Iran". In Frye, Richard N. (ed.). The Cambridge History of Iran: From the Arab Invasion to the Saljuqs. Vol. 4. Cambridge: Cambridge University Press. pp. 198–249. ISBN 0-521-20093-8.
- Madelung, Wilferd (1993). "DABUYIDS". In Yarshater, Ehsan (ed.). Encyclopædia Iranica. Vol. VI/5: Čūb-bāzī–Daf(f) and Dāyera. London and New York: Routledge & Kegan Paul. pp. 541–544. ISBN 978-1-56859-003-5.
- Malek, Hodge Mehdi (1995). "The Dabuyid Isphabads of Tabaristan". The American Numismatic Society: 105–160.
- Malek, Hodge Mehdi (2017). "Tabaristān During the 'Abbāsid Period: The Overlapping Coinage of the Governors and Other Officials (144-178H)". In Faghfoury, Mostafa (ed.). Iranian Numismatic Studies. A Volume in Honor of Stephen Album. Lancaster and London: Classical Numismatic Group. pp. 101–126.
- Pourshariati, Parvaneh (2008). Decline and Fall of the Sasanian Empire: The Sasanian-Parthian Confederacy and the Arab Conquest of Iran. London and New York: I.B. Tauris. ISBN 978-1-84511-645-3.
- Rekaya, M. (1986). "Khurshīd". In Bosworth, C. E.; van Donzel, E.; Lewis, B. & Pellat, Ch. (eds.). The Encyclopaedia of Islam, Second Edition. Volume V: Khe–Mahi. Leiden: E. J. Brill. pp. 68–70. ISBN 978-90-04-07819-2.
- Schindel, Nikolaus (2013). "Sasanian Coinage". In Potts, Daniel T. (ed.). The Oxford Handbook of Ancient Iran. Oxford University Press. ISBN 978-0199733309.
- Yavari, Neguin (2020). "Dābūyids". In Fleet, Kate; Krämer, Gudrun; Matringe, Denis; Nawas, John; Rowson, Everett (eds.). Encyclopaedia of Islam (3rd ed.). Brill Online. ISSN 1873-9830.
- Browne, Edward G. (1905). An Abridged Translation of the History of Tabaristan, Compiled About A.H. 613 (A.D. 1216), by Muhammad b. al-Hasan b. Isfandiyar. Leiden and London: E. J. Brill and Bernard Quaritch.
- Azami Sangsari, Cheragh Ali (1978), "Gil Gavbara, Padishkhwargars and Dabuyid Dynasty (Great Ispahbads of Tabarestan)", Historical Studies, 71: 39–90

Farrukhan the Great Dabuyid dynasty
Iranian royalty
Preceded by Dabuya as Ispahbadh of Tabaristan	Ispahbadh of Tabaristan; 712–728	Succeeded by Dadhburzmihr as Ispahbadh of Tabaristan
