= Gil Gavbara =

Gil Gavbara(Gil GilanShah)
- Ispahbadh of Persia
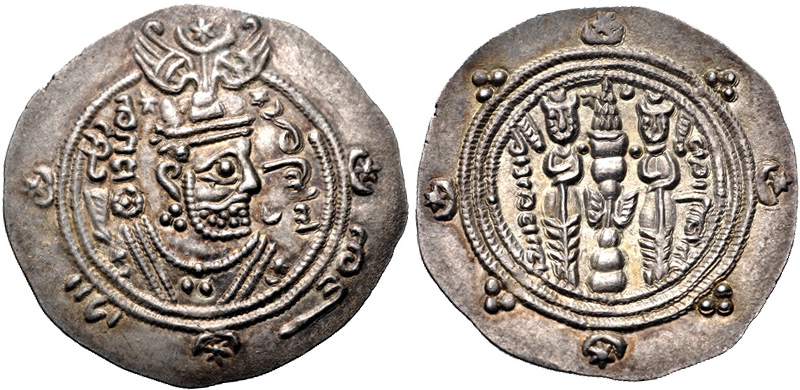
- Silver dirham of Gil Gavbara
- Reign: 642-660
- Successor: Dabuya
- Born: 7th-century Gilan
- Died: 660
- Issue: Dabuya
Names
- Gil son of Gilanshah
- House: Dabuyid dynasty
- Father: Gilanshah
- Religion: Zoroastrianism

Gil Gavbara, Gil GilanShah (Persian: گیل گاوباره,گیل گیلانشاه), also known as Gavbarih (the Cow Devotee), was a general and founder of the Dabuyid dynasty in 642, ruling until his death in 660.

== Origins ==
According to Ibn Isfandiyar, the Dabuyids were descended from Djamasp, a brother of the Sasanian shah Kavadh I. Gil Gavbara was the grandson of Piruz, who is described as brave as the Iranian mythological hero Rostam. Piruz later became the ruler of Gilan, and married a local princess who bore him a son named Gilanshah, who in turn had a son, Gil Gavbara.

== Biography ==
Piruz died around 642 and was succeeded by Gil Gavbara as the ruler of Gilan. Gil Gavbara, together with Farrukhzad from the House of Ispahbudhan, signed a peace treaty with the Arab conquerors and was given control of Tabaristan, which led to the formal conferment of the titles of Gil-Gilan ("ruler of Gilan") and Padashwargarshah ("Shah of Patashwargar", the old name of Tabaristan's mountains) to Gil Gavbara's son Dabuya by Yazdegerd III, the last Sasanian shah.

== Sources ==
- Madelung, W. (1975). "The Minor Dynasties of Northern Iran". In Frye, Richard N. (ed.). The Cambridge History of Iran: From the Arab Invasion to the Saljuqs. Vol. 4. Cambridge: Cambridge University Press. pp. 198–249. ISBN 0-521-20093-8.
- Madelung, Wilferd (1993). "DABUYIDS". In Yarshater, Ehsan (ed.). Encyclopaedia Iranica, Vol. VI, Fasc. 5. London et al.: Routledge & Kegan Paul. pp. 541–544. ISBN 1-56859-007-5.
- Pourshariati, Parvaneh (2008). Decline and Fall of the Sasanian Empire: The Sasanian-Parthian Confederacy and the Arab Conquest of Iran. London and New York: I.B. Tauris. ISBN 978-1-84511-645-3.
- Ibn, Isfandiyar (1905). An Abridged Translation of the History of Tabaristan. University of Michigan: BRILL. pp. 1–356. ISBN 9789004093676. "'."

Gil Gavbara Dabuyid dynasty Born: Unknown Died: 660
Iranian royalty
Preceded by Piruz	Ispahbadh of Tabaristan; 642-660	Succeeded by Dabuya
