= Dadhburzmihr =

- Ispahbadh of Tabaristan
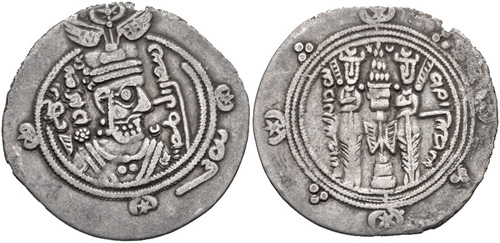
- Silver dirham of Dadhburzmihr
- Reign: 728–740/1
- Predecessor: Farrukhan the Great
- Successor: Khurshid of Tabaristan (with Farrukhan the Little as regent)
- Died: 740/1; Tabaristan
- Issue: Khurshid of Tabaristan
- House: Dabuyid dynasty
- Father: Farrukhan the Great
- Religion: Zoroastrianism

Dadhburzmihr (also spelled Dadmihr or Dazmihr) was the independent ruler (ispahbadh) of Tabaristan. He succeeded his father Farrukhan the Great in 728 and reigned until his death in 740/1. According to the 13-century Iranian historian Ibn Isfandiyar, Dadhburzmihr enjoyed a peaceful reign, facing no invasions from the Arab Caliphate, due to their attention being directed towards local revolts. His 6-year-old son, Khurshid succeeded him.

His name is a combination of dād ("created") and the proper noun Burz-Mihr, which is itself formed from burz ("exalted"), and the divine name Mihr (Mithra).

== Sources ==
- Gignoux, Philippe (1986). Iranisches Personennamenbuch II, fasc. 2: Noms propres sassanides en moyen-perse épigraphique (in French). Austrian Academy of Sciences. ISBN 978-3700132080.
- Madelung, W. (1975). "The Minor Dynasties of Northern Iran". In Frye, Richard N. (ed.). The Cambridge History of Iran: From the Arab Invasion to the Saljuqs. Vol. 4. Cambridge: Cambridge University Press. pp. 198–249. ISBN 0-521-20093-8.
- Madelung, Wilferd (1993). "Dabuyids". In Yarshater, Ehsan (ed.). Encyclopaedia Iranica, Vol. VI, Fasc. 5. London et al.: Routledge & Kegan Paul. pp. 541–544. ISBN 1-56859-007-5.
- Malek, Hodge Mehdi (1995). "The Dābūyid Ispahbads of Ṭabaristān". American Journal of Numismatics. 5/6: 105–160. JSTOR 43580501. (registration required)
- Pourshariati, Parvaneh (2008). Decline and Fall of the Sasanian Empire: The Sasanian-Parthian Confederacy and the Arab Conquest of Iran. London and New York: I.B. Tauris. ISBN 978-1-84511-645-3.

Dadhburzmihr Dabuyid dynasty
Iranian royalty
Preceded by Farrukhan the Great	Ispahbadh of Tabaristan; 728–740/1	Succeeded by Farrukhan the Little
