= Masmughan =

Masmughan ("Chief Magian" or "Great one of the Magians") was a Sasanian title that existed in the 7th century, probably equivalent to governor of a district or a region.

The collapse of the Sasanian Empire resulted in the rise of several independent dynasties in Tabaristan. A certain Karenid named Mardanshah, carried the title of Masmughan and held control over Damavand and Larijan including its surrounding areas. His successors would control the area until in 760 when the region was conquered by the Arabs.

Another Karenid named Valash appears to bear the title of Masmughan, who served as Marzban of Miyano-du-rud, near Sari between the Kalarud river limited to the east with Karatughan. Valash was later murdered in revenge by Sukhrab I, the ispahbadh of the Bavand dynasty.

== See also ==
- Paduspanids
- Seven Parthian clans
- Zarmihrids

== Sources ==
- Pourshariati, Parvaneh (2008). Decline and Fall of the Sasanian Empire: The Sasanian-Parthian Confederacy and the Arab Conquest of Iran. London and New York: I.B. Tauris. ISBN 978-1-84511-645-3.
