= Abu al-Khasib =

8th-century Abbasid general and administrator

Abbasid Governor of Tabaristan
- In office 760–763
- Monarch: al-Mansur
- Preceded by: Khurshid (as Dabuyid ruler)
- Succeeded by: Khazim b. Khuzaymah

Military service
- Allegiance: Abbasid Caliphate

Abu al-Khaṣīb Marzuq was an Abbasid general and administrator during the reign of Abu Ja'far al-Mansur. A mawla of Mansur in his early life, Abu al-Khasib rose to the position of Hajib (chamberlain) in 755. In 760, he was sent by Mansur to conquer Tabaristan from its Dabuyid ruler, Khurshid. After the conquest of Tabaristan, he was appointed as its first Abbasid governor, a position he retained until about 763.

== Biography ==
Abu al-Khasib was from Sind. According to Ibn Isfandiyar, he had been a client (mawali) of Muthanna ibn al-Hajjaj ibn Qutayba ibn Muslim. He is first mentioned in 755, when he was sent by Abbasid Caliph Mansur as his chamberlain to Abu Muslim Khurasani to calculate what he had acquired by defeating Abdullah ibn Ali, the caliph's uncle. When Abu Muslim refused to hand over the wealth, Abu al-Khasib returned to Mansur and told him about Abu Muslim's intentions. This sowed the seeds of distrust between the caliph and Abu Muslim, ultimately leading to Abu Muslim's execution a few months later. Abu al-Khasib also helped Ma'n ibn Za'ida to go into hiding and sought protection for him, helping him in gaining indemnity from prosecution.

In 759, Dabuyid Ispahbadh of Tabaristan, Khurshid, rebelled killing Muslims living in Tabaristan. In response, Mansur sent Abu al-Khasib, along with Khazim ibn Khuzaymah and Rawh ibn Hatim against him. They besieged and ultimately conquered his fortress. Khurshid later committed suicide by taking poison. Abu al-Khasib was appointed as governor of Tabaristan, a position he held until 763.

Although no coins are known from Abu al-Khasib's tenure as governor of Tabaristan, he is known to have built a great mosque in the city of Sari, probably in 761. Abu al-Khasib also ordered the excavation of Abu al-Khasib canal in Basra, named after him, which in turn gave its name to the present-day Abu Al-Khaseeb District.

== See also ==
- Al-Sindi ibn Shahak
- Al-Sari ibn al-Hakam

== Sources ==
- Khudayyir, Muhammad (2020). Basrayatha: The Story of a City. Verso Books. ISBN 978-1-78960-381-1.
- Malek, Hodge M. (2004). The Dābūyid Ispahbads and Early 'Abbāsid Governors of Tabaristān: History and Numismatics. Royal Numismatic Society. ISBN 978-0-901405-83-8.
- Crone, Patricia (1980). Slaves on Horses: The Evolution of the Islamic Polity. Cambridge University Press. ISBN 978-0-521-52940-2.
- al-Tabari (2015). The History of al-Ṭabarī Vol. 28: 'Abbasid Authority Affirmed: The Early Years of al-Manṣūr A.D. 753-763/A.H. 136-145. State University of New York Press. ISBN 978-1-4384-1232-0.
- Madelung, W. (1975). "The Minor Dynasties of Northern Iran". In Frye, Richard N. (ed.). The Cambridge History of Iran: From the Arab Invasion to the Saljuqs. Vol. 4. Cambridge: Cambridge University Press. ISBN 0-521-20093-8.
