= Farrukhan the Little =

Farrukhan the Little (Persian: Farrukhan-e Kuchak), also surnamed the Deaf (Korbali), was a member of the Dabuyid dynasty, which ruled Tabaristan as independent monarchs in the century after the Muslim conquest of Persia. The brother of the ispahbadh Dadhburzmihr, Farrukhan ruled Tabaristan between 740/41 and 747/48 as regent for his underage nephew, Khurshid.

== Biography ==
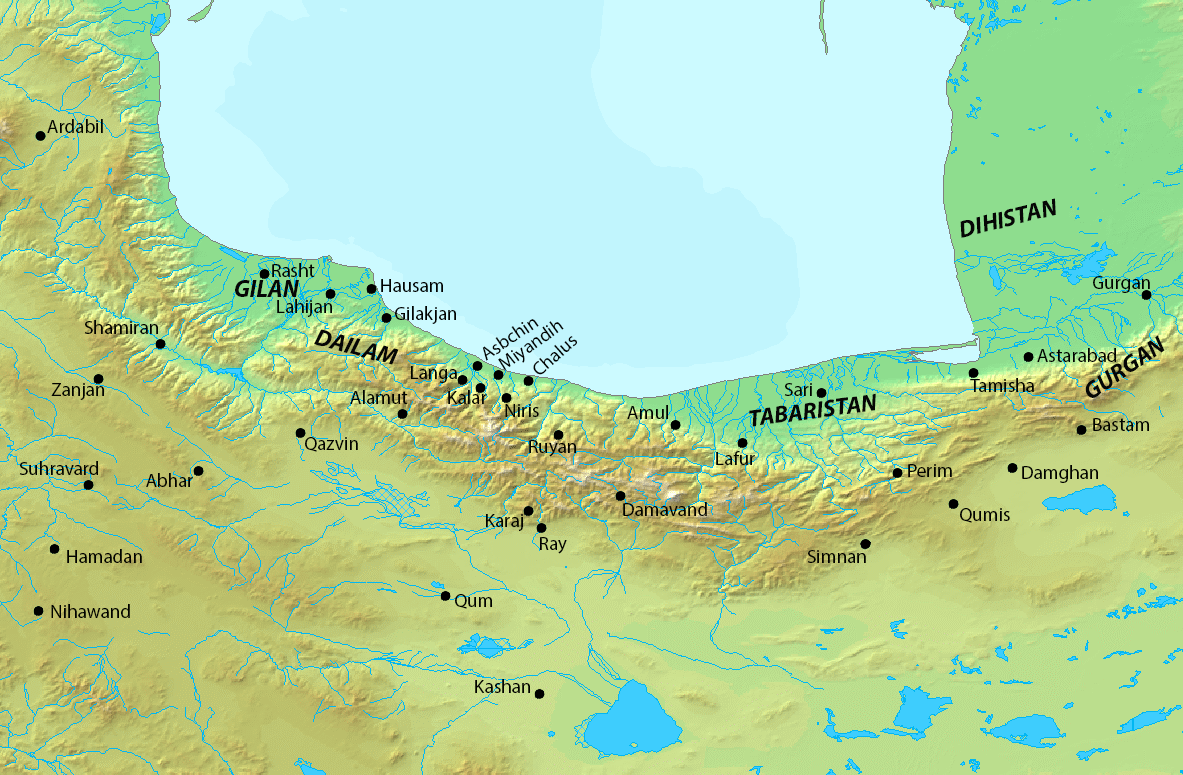
Map of Tabaristan and its neighbouring territories

Farrukhan was the younger son of Farrukhan the Great (died ca. 728), the first ruler (ispahbadh) of the Dabuyid dynasty from whose reign coins are known. According to the traditional account, the Dabuyids had established themselves as the quasi-independent rulers of Tabaristan in the 640s, during the tumults of the Muslim conquest of Persia and the collapse of the Sassanid Empire. They owed only the payment tribute and nominal vassalage to the Arab Caliphate, and managed, despite repeated Muslim attempts at invasion, to maintain their autonomy by exploiting the inaccessible terrain of their country. A more recent interpretation of the sources by P. Pourshariati, however, supports that Farrukhan the Great was the one who actually established the family's rule over Tabaristan, sometime in the 670s.

Farrukhan the Great was succeeded by his eldest son, Dadhburzmihr, who died in 740/41. He was succeeded by his son, Khurshid, but he was only six years old. Shortly before his death, Dadhburzmihr appointed Farrukhan the Little as regent until Khurshid came of age. Farrukhan effectively ruled Tabaristan for the next eight years, but this is not reflected in the coinage of the period, with coins struck solely in Khurshid's name from 741 on. Farrukhan's regency coincides with recorded attempts by the Dabuyids to strengthen their position vis-á-vis the Umayyad Caliphate; they used the turmoil of the Third Fitna to rebel against Caliph Marwan II (r. 744–750), and even sent an embassy to the Tang court in 746, which recognized him ("king Hu-lu-ban") as a vassal prince.

When Khurshid came of age, Farrukhan prepared to hand over power, but his own sons disagreed and tried to usurp the throne. Their plot was allegedly betrayed to Khurshid by a slave girl, Varmja Haraviya. With the help of the sons of another cousin, Jushnas, Khurshid managed to defeat and imprison Farrukhan's sons. He later took Varmja Haraviya as his wife, while the sons of Jushnas were given high positions in the state.

== Sources ==
- Madelung, W. (1975). "The Minor Dynasties of Northern Iran". In Frye, Richard N. (ed.). The Cambridge History of Iran. Vol. 4. Cambridge: Cambridge University Press. pp. 198–249. ISBN 0-521-20093-8.
- Madelung, Wilferd (1993). "DABUYIDS". In Yarshater, Ehsan (ed.). Encyclopaedia Iranica, Vol. VI, Fasc. 5. London et al.: Routledge & Kegan Paul. pp. 541–544. ISBN 1-56859-007-5.
- Pourshariati, Parvaneh (2008). Decline and Fall of the Sasanian Empire: The Sasanian-Parthian Confederacy and the Arab Conquest of Iran. London and New York: I.B. Tauris. ISBN 978-1-84511-645-3.
- Rekaya, M. (1986). "Khurshīd". In Bosworth, C. E.; van Donzel, E.; Lewis, B. & Pellat, Ch. (eds.). The Encyclopaedia of Islam, Second Edition. Volume V: Khe–Mahi. Leiden: E. J. Brill. pp. 68–70. ISBN 978-90-04-07819-2.

Farrukhan the Little Dabuyid dynasty
Iranian royalty
| Preceded by Dadhburzmihr as Ispahbadh of Tabaristan | Regent of Tabaristan; 740/41–747/48 with Khurshid (740/41–759/60) | Succeeded by Khurshid as Ispahbadh of Tabaristan |
