= Saïd Amir Arjomand =

Iranian-American sociologist (born 1946)

Saïd Amir Arjomand (Persian: سعید امیر ارجمند, b. 26 December 1946) is an Iranian-American scholar and Distinguished Service Professor Emeritus of Sociology at Stony Brook University, Long Island, and former Director of the Stony Brook Institute for Global Studies. He received his Ph.D. in 1980 from the University of Chicago.

Arjomand is the founder and former president of the Association for the Study of Persianate Societies (ASPS) and founding Editor of the Journal of Persianate Studies. He has held multiple fellowships (Fall 1998, Spring 2018, Spring 2019) at the Swedish Collegium for Advanced Study in Uppsala, Sweden.

== Works ==
=== Books ===
- The Shadow of God and the Hidden Imam: Religion, Political Organization and Societal Change in Shi'ite Iran from the Beginning to 1890, the University of Chicago Press, 1984
- The Turban for the Crown: The Islamic Revolution in Iran, Oxford University Press, 1988
- The Political Dimensions of Religion, edited with an introduction, State University of New York Press, 1993
- Rethinking Civilizational Analysis, edited with Edward A. Tiryakian, London: Sage Publishers, 2004
- Constitutionalism and Political Reconstruction, edited with an introduction, Leiden: E.J. Brill, 2007
- Constitutional Politics in the Middle East, edited with an introduction, London: Hart Publishers, 2008
- After Khomeini, Iran under his Successors, Oxford University Press, 2009
- The Rule of Law, Islam and Constitutional Politics in Egypt and Iran, edited with Nathan J. Brown, State University of New York Press, 2013
- Worlds of Difference, co-edited, Sage, 2013
- Social Theory and Regional Studies in the Global Age, edited, SUNY Press, 2013
- Sociology of Shiʿite Islam Collected Essays By Saïd Amir Arjomand, 2016
- Revolution: Structure and Meaning in World History, the University of Chicago Press, 2019
- 'Messianism and Sociopolitical Revolution in Medieval Islam, University of California Press, 2022

=== Selected articles ===
- Religious Human Rights and the Principle of Legal Pluralism in the Middle East, in J. van der Vyver and J. Witte, eds., Religious Human Rights in Global Perspective, Vol. 2: Legal Perspectives, M. Nijhoff, 1995, pp. 331–347.
- Unity and Diversity in Islamic Fundamentalism, in M. Marty and R.S. Appleby, eds., Fundamentalisms Comprehended, the University of Chicago Press, 1995, pp. 179–198.
- Crisis of the Imamate and the Institution of Occultation in Twelver Shi`ism: a Sociohistorical Perspective, International Journal of Middle East Studies 28.4 (1996): pp. 491–515.
- The Consolation of Theology: The Shi`ite Doctrine of Occultation and the Transition from Chiliasm to Law, 76.4 (1996): pp. 548–571.
- Islamic Apocalypticism in the Classical Period, in B. McGinn, ed., The Encyclopedia of Apocalypticism, New York: Continuum, vol. 2, 1998, pp. 238–283.
- The Law, Agency and Policy in Medieval Islamic Society: Development of the Institutions of Learning from the Tenth to the Fifteenth Century, Comparative Studies in Society and History, 41.2 (1999), pp 263–293.
- Civil Society and the Rule of Law in the Constitutional Politics of Iran under Khatami, Social Research, 76.2 (2000), pp. 283–301.
- Authority in Shi`ism and Constitutional Developments in the Islamic Republic of Iran, in W. Ende & R. Brunner, eds., The Twelver Shia in Modern Times: Religious Culture & Political History, Leiden: Brill, 2000, pp. 301–332.
- Perso-Indian Statecraft, Greek Political Science and the Muslim Idea of Government, International Sociology, 16.3 (2001), pp. 461–480.
- Social Theory and the Changing World: Mass Democracy, Development, Modernization and Globalization, International Sociology, 19.3 (2004), pp. 321–53.
- Coffeehouses, Guilds & Oriental Despotism: Government & Civil Society in late-17th-early 18th Century Istanbul and Isfahan, and as seen from Paris & London, Archives européennes de sociologie/European Journal of Sociology, 45.1 (2004), pp. 23–42.
- Rationalization, the Constitution of Meaning and Institutional Development, in C. Camic & H. Joas, eds., The Dialogical Turn. New Roles for Sociology in the Post-Disciplinary Age, Rowman & Littlefield, 2004, pp. 247–74.
- Islam, Political Change and Globalization, Thesis Eleven, 76 (2004), pp. 5–24.
- Developmental Patterns and Processes in Islamicate Civilization and the Impact of Modernization, in Hans Joas & Barbro Klein, eds., The Benefit Of Broad Horizons: Intellectual And Institutional Preconditions For A Global Social Science, Leiden: Brill, 2010, pp. 205–26.
- Legitimacy and Political Organisation: Caliphs, Kings and Regimes, being Ch. 7 of The New Cambridge History of Islam, vol. 4 (R. Irwin, ed.; M. Cook, ed.-in-chief), 2010, pp. 225–73.
- Legitimacy and Political Organisation: Caliphs, Kings and Regimes, being Ch. 7 of The New Cambridge History of Islam, vol. 4 (R. Irwin, ed.; M. Cook, ed.-in-chief), 2010, pp. 225–73.
- The Kingdom of Jurists: Constitutionalism in Iran, in Constitutionalism in Islamic Countries: Between Upheaval and Continuity (eds. Rainer Grote and Tilmann Röder, Oxford/New York: OUP, 2011.
