= Association for the Study of Persianate Societies =

Professional organization for Persian studies

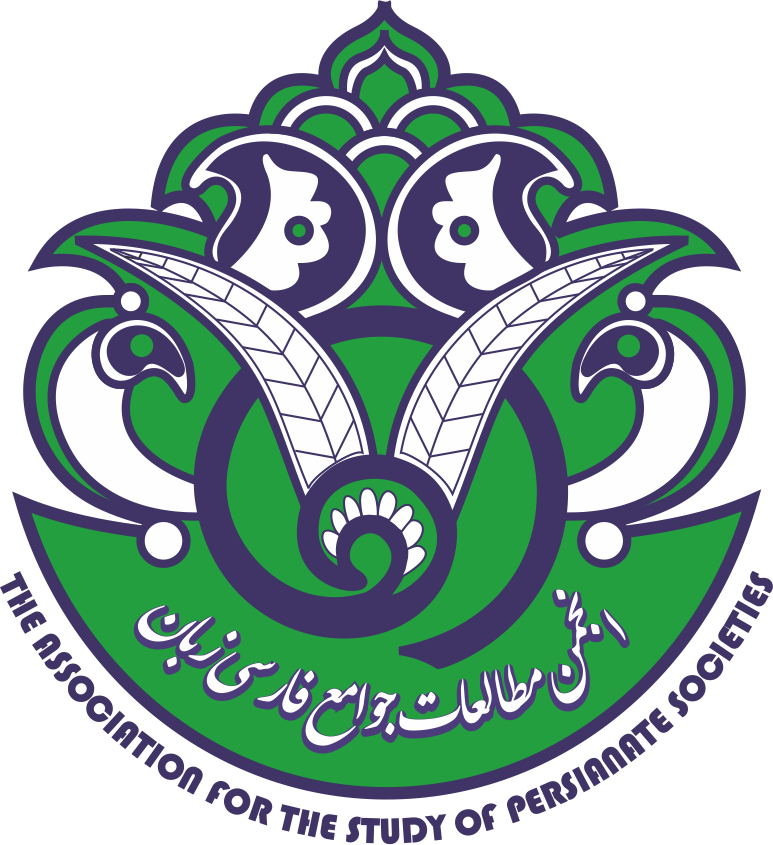
Logo of the 'Association for the Study of Persianate Societies'

The Association for the Study of Persianate Societies (Persian: انجمن مطالعات جوامع فارسی زبان), also known as ASPS, is a non-governmental, non-political, not-for-profit professional organization for researchers and scholars dedicated to the study of the cultures and societies of the regions where Persian has historically been a significant presence and major cultural force, encompassing Iran, Afghanistan, and Tajikistan, as well as the Caucasus, Central Asia, the Indian Subcontinent, and parts of the former Ottoman Empire. The association's head office is based in Princeton, NJ, with branches in a number of countries in the Caucasus, Central Asia, South Asia, Japan, Poland, and Austria. The ASPS is one of the partner organisations of Middle East Studies Association of North America.

== History ==
The Association for the Study of Persianate Societies was founded by Professor Saïd Amir Arjomand in 2002. He was also the first president of the association. Professor Amir Arjomand was followed by Professors Parvaneh Pourshariati, Rudi Matthee, Sunil Sharma, Sussan Babaei, and Mirjam Kuenkler.

== Journal and Biennial Conference ==
ASPS' "Journal of Persianate Studies" is published by Brill in the Netherlands. The association also organises biennial international conferences. Conferences have been held in Tajikistan, Turkey, Bosnia and Herzegovina, India, Pakistan, Georgia, Armenia, and Uzbekistan. The 2027 conference will be held in Dushanbe.
