= Mardanshah of Damavand =

Sasanian noble

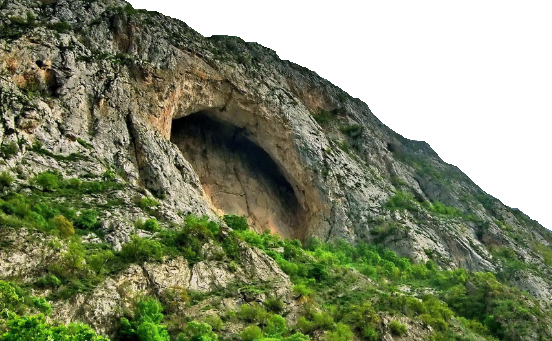

Mardanshah was an Iranian nobleman from the House of Karen, who was the founder of the Masmughans of Damavand dynasty, which included Larijan and its surrounding areas. During the Arab conquest of Iran, he sent reinforcements to aid Siyavakhsh at Ray against the Arabs. Siyavaksh, was however, defeated. The Arabs then proceeded to Damavand, where Mardanshah made peace with Arabs, while being promised that he will not be attacked, nor approached without his permission, in return for giving tribute to the Caliphate. He thereafter disappears from history chronicles.
