= Khurshid of Tabaristan =

8th-century Ispahbadh of Tabaristan

Khurshid
- Ispahbadh of Tabaristan
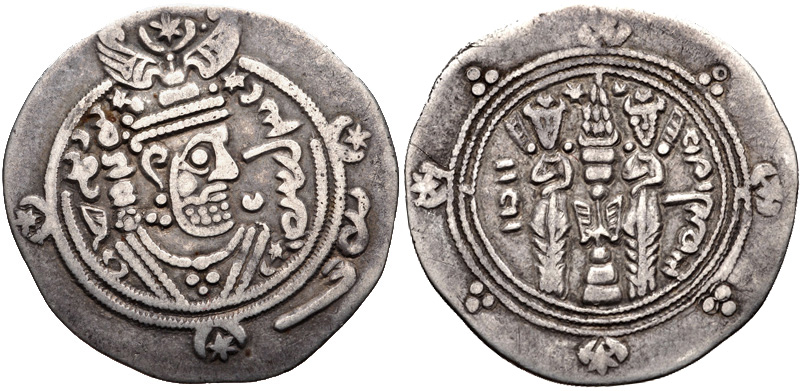
- Silver dirham issued by Khurshid
- Reign: 740–760
- Predecessor: Dadmihr
- Successor: Abbasid conquest
- Regent: Farrukhan the Little
- Born: 734; Sari
- Died: 761 (aged 26–27); Palam, Daylam
- Consort: Varmja Haraviya
- House: Dabuyid dynasty
- Father: Dadmihr
- Religion: Zoroastrianism

Khurshid (Book Pahlavi: hwlšyt'; Tabari/Persian: اسپهبد خورشید, Spāhbed Khōrshīd 'General Khorshid'; 734–761), erroneously designated Khurshid II by earlier scholars, was the last Dabuyid ispahbadh of Tabaristan. He succeeded to the throne at an early age, and was supervised by his uncle as regent until he reached the age of fourteen. Khurshid supported various rebellions and maintained diplomatic contacts with Tang China. Finally, the Abbasids conquered his country in 759–760, and captured most members of his family. Khurshid fled to Daylam, where he ended his life.

== Biography ==
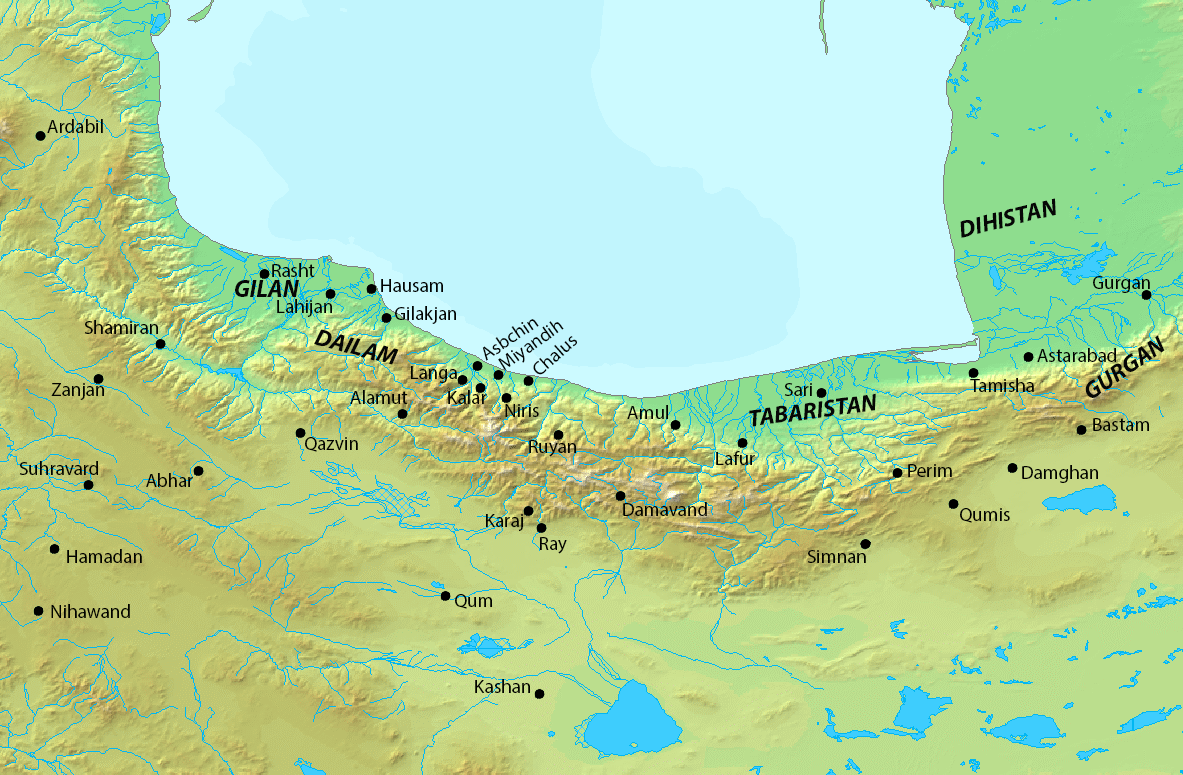
Map of Tabaristan and its neighbouring territories

Khurshid was born in 734/735, the son of Dadhburzmihr or Dadmihr (died 740) and grandson of Farrukhan the Great (died ca. 728), the first ruler (ispahbadh) of the Dabuyid dynasty from whose reign coins are known. According to the traditional account, the Dabuyids had established themselves as the autonomous rulers of Tabaristan in the 640s, during the tumults of the Muslim conquest of Persia and the collapse of the Sasanian Empire. They owed only the payment tribute to the Arab Caliphate, and managed, despite repeated Muslim attempts at invasion, to maintain their autonomy by exploiting the inaccessible terrain of their country. A more recent interpretation of the sources by P. Pourshariati, however, supports that Farrukhan was the one who actually established the family's rule over Tabaristan, sometime in the 670s. In earlier works on the dynasty, Khurshid is named Khurshid II, due to erroneous interpretation of numismatic evidence, which led earlier scholars to interpolate a first Khurshid before Farrukhan, whose rule was thought to have begun ca. 710.

Khurshid succeeded his father at the age of only six, and for eight years the regency was exercised by his uncle Farrukhan-i Kuchak ("Farrukhan the Little"). When Khurshid came of age, Farrukhan's own sons refused to recognize his claim and tried to usurp the throne. Their plot was allegedly betrayed to Khurshid by a slave girl, Varmja Haraviya. With the help of the sons of his cousin Jushnas, Khurshid managed to defeat and imprison Farrukhan's sons. He later took Varmja Haraviya as his wife, while the sons of Jushnas were given high positions in the state. The historian Ibn Isfandiyar gives a vivid description of the prosperity of Tabaristan at this time, which was a major centre for textile production (including silk), and which traded with the Turks of Central Asia, probably via the Caspian Sea. Khurshid is said to have contributed to this prosperity by building numerous bazaars and caravanserais. Khurshid also tried to consolidate and even extend his royal power, and used the turmoil within the Umayyad Caliphate during the Third Fitna to this effect, rebelling against Caliph Marwan II (r. 744–750), and even sending an embassy to the Tang court in 746, which recognized him ("king Hu-lu-ban") as a vassal prince.

During the Abbasid Revolution, however, he was forced to submit to the Abbasid armies under Abu Muslim. As one of Abu Muslim's vassals, he supported the latter in his quarrel with the Caliph al-Mansur (r. 754–775). After the Caliph had Abu Muslim murdered in 755, Khurshid supported the anti-Abbasid rebellion of Sunbadh, who entrusted part of Abu Muslim's treasure to Khurshid's keeping. When Sunbadh's revolt was defeated, Sunbadh fled to Tabaristan, but was killed there by one of Khurshid's cousins, ostensibly because he had failed to show the man proper respect. It is possible, however, that the murder was instigated by Khurshid, in the hope of acquiring the remainder of Abu Muslim's treasure. Al-Mansur sent his son and heir, al-Mahdi (r. 775–785), to recover the treasure of Abu Muslim. Khurshid denied having it, and al-Mansur tried to unseat Khurshid by crowning one of his cousins as ispahbadh. This did not have the desired effect of challenging the loyalty of Khurshid's subjects, but Khurshid was eventually forced to accommodate the Abbasids by accepting an increase in the annual tribute, which brought it to the level paid to the Sassanids.

Soon after, nevertheless, Khurshid took advantage of the rebellion of Abd al-Jabar ibn Abd al-Rahman, the governor of Khurasan, to once again throw off allegiance to the Caliphate. Al-Mansur sent his generals Abu al-Khaṣīb Marzuq and Khazim bin Khuzaymah into Tabaristan, with the intention of completely subduing the country and making it a province. Khurshid fled to the fortress of al-Tak in the mountains, where he was besieged in 759–760. Although Khurshid himself escaped to nearby Daylam, the fortress eventually fell, and with it his family fell into the hands of the Abbasids and brought to Baghdad. From Daylam, Khurshid tried to regain his kingdom. He raised an army from the mountain dwellers of the region, and invaded Tabaristan in 760. Repulsed, he returned to Daylam. After learning of his family's capture, he is said to have exclaimed "after this there is no inclination to life and joy, and death is the very solace and respite itself", and took poison, probably in 761.

Tabaristan became a regular province of the Caliphate, ruled from Amul by an Arab governor, although the local dynasties of the Bavandids, Karinids and Zarmihrids, formerly subject to the Dabuyids, continued to control the mountainous interior as tributary vassals of the Abbasid government. Coins were minted in Tabaristan in Khurshid's name until 764, whereafter the name of the Abbasid governor was substituted. As a result, some earlier works also mention 767 as the date of Khurshid's death.

== Family ==
After their capture, Khurshid's sons, the crown prince Dadmihr, Hormozd and Vandad-Hormozd, received Arabic names, but otherwise their fate is unknown. According to Chinese sources, on the other hand, one of them was on embassy in the Tang court at the time Tabaristan was conquered. Khurshid's daughters were distributed as concubines to members of the Abbasid dynasty. The names and genealogy of these princesses are confused, but one was taken by al-Mansur himself and another by his brother, Abbas ibn Muhammad. Al-Bakhtariyya, a daughter of Farrukhan-i Kuchak, became the concubine of al-Mahdi, and it is reported that another of al-Mahdi's concubines, Shakla, was a daughter of Khurshid. In 817, during the Fourth Fitna, the populace of Baghdad turned to their sons to make them caliphs in opposition to al-Ma'mun (r. 813–833). Al-Bakhtariyya's son al-Mansur ibn al-Mahdi refused, but his half-brother Ibrahim ibn al-Mahdi accepted and ruled as anti-caliph until 819.

== Sources ==
- Malek, Hodge M. (2004). The Dābūyid Ispahbads and Early 'Abbāsid Governors of Tabaristān: History and Numismatics. Royal Numismatic Society. ISBN 978-0-901405-83-8.
- Madelung, W. (1975). "The Minor Dynasties of Northern Iran". In Frye, Richard N. (ed.). The Cambridge History of Iran: From the Arab Invasion to the Saljuqs. Vol. 4. Cambridge: Cambridge University Press. pp. 198–249. ISBN 0-521-20093-8.
- Madelung, Wilferd (1993). "DABUYIDS". In Yarshater, Ehsan (ed.). Encyclopædia Iranica. Vol. VI/5: Čūb-bāzī–Daf(f) and Dāyera. London and New York: Routledge & Kegan Paul. pp. 541–544. ISBN 978-1-56859-003-5.
- Pourshariati, Parvaneh (2008). Decline and Fall of the Sasanian Empire: The Sasanian-Parthian Confederacy and the Arab Conquest of Iran (PDF). London and New York: I.B. Tauris. ISBN 978-1-84511-645-3.
- Rekaya, M. (1986). "Khurshīd". In Bosworth, C. E.; van Donzel, E.; Lewis, B. & Pellat, Ch. (eds.). The Encyclopaedia of Islam, Second Edition. Volume V: Khe–Mahi. Leiden: E. J. Brill. pp. 68–70. ISBN 978-90-04-07819-2.

Khurshid of Tabaristan Dabuyid dynasty Born: 734 Died: 761
Iranian royalty
| Preceded by Dadmihr | Ispahbadh of Tabaristan; 740–759/760 with Farrukhan the Little (740–748) | Abbasid conquest of Tabaristan |
