= Barbro Klein =

Swedish professor of ethnology

Barbro Klein (1938 – 15 January 2018) was a Swedish professor of ethnology. After a bachelor's degree at the Stockholm University in 1961, she obtained a scholarship to study at Indiana University Bloomington where she received her Ph.D. in folklore studies and anthropology in 1970 under the direction of Richard Dorson. She returned to Scandinavia in 1983, to take a position at the Stockholm University. Klein was Director emerita of the Swedish Collegium for Advanced Study (SCAS), and a member of the executive board of the American Folklore Society. In 2017, she was awarded the H. M. The King's Medal for “significant contributions to Swedish and international scholarship and as an ethnologist.”

Klein wrote extensively on oral narration, rituals, and expressive culture, often in multi-ethnic settings. Her main fields were the folklore of Northern America and Scandinavia.

== Selected writings ==
- (1980) Legends and Folk Beliefs in a Swedish-American Community: A Study in Folklore and Acculturation
- (2000) The Moral Content of Tradition: Homecraft, Ethnology, and Swedish Life in the Twentieth Century. Western Folklore.
- (2006) Narrating, Doing, Experiencing: Nordic Folkloristic Perspectives (edited with Annikki Kaivola-Bregenhøj and Ulf Palmenfelt)
