= Zames =

Zames is a surname. Notable people with the surname include:

- Frieda Zames (1932–2005), American disability rights activist
- George Zames (1934–1997), Polish-Canadian control theorist
