= Journal of Persianate Studies =

- Discipline: Persianate society
- Language: English
- Edited by: Saïd Amir Arjomand

Publication details
- History: 2008–present
- Publisher: Brill Publishers
- Frequency: Biannually

Standard abbreviations
- ISO 4: J. Persianate Stud.

Indexing
- ISSN: 1874-7094 (print); 1874-7167 (web)
- LCCN: 2008236337
- OCLC no.: 402770944

Links
- Journal homepage; Online access

Journal of Persianate Studies is a peer-reviewed academic journal publishing articles on the culture of a vast geographical area (including Iran, Afghanistan, and Tajikistan, as well as the Caucasus, Central Asia, the Indian subcontinent, and parts of the former Ottoman Empire) where the Persian language has or has had a significant presence.

== See also ==
- Encyclopædia Iranica
- Iranian studies
