= Dabuyid dynasty =

7th century Iranian dynasty

- 642–760
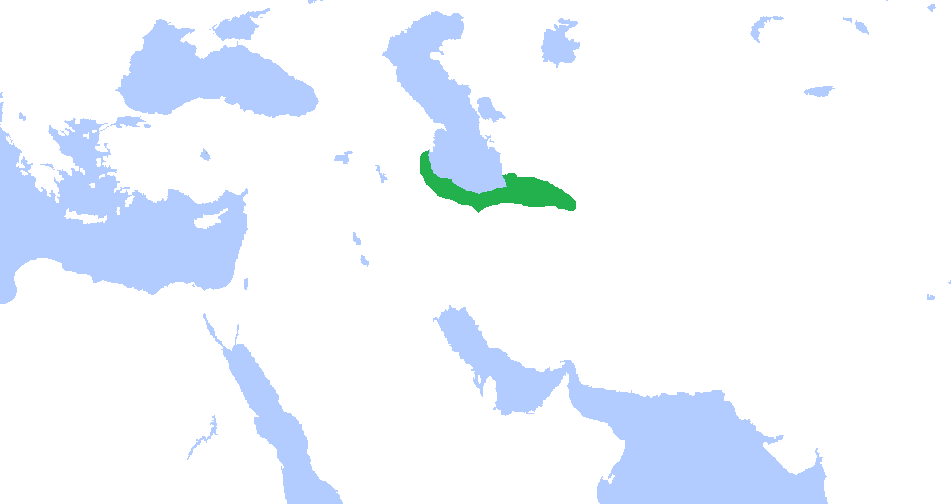
- The Dabuyid dynasty around its greatest extent under Farrukhan the Great
- Capital: Fuman (660–760)
- Common languages: Middle Persian, Caspian languages, Tabari
- Religion: Zoroastrianism
- Government: Monarchy
- Ispahbadh
  - 640–660: Gil Gavbara (first)
  - 740/41–759/60: Khurshid (last)
- Historical era: Middle Ages
  - Muslim conquest of Persia: 642
  - Abbasid conquest: 760
Preceded by
Sasanian Empire
Succeeded by
Abbasid Caliphate
Bavand dynasty
Baduspanids
Qarinvand dynasty
- Today part of: Azerbaijan; Iran; Turkmenistan

The Dabuyid dynasty (Persian: سلسله دابویگان), or Gaubarid dynasty (Persian: دودمان گاوبارگان), was a Zoroastrian Iranian dynasty that started in the first half of the 7th century as an independent group of rulers who ruled over Tabaristan and parts of western Khorasan. Dabuyid rule over Tabaristan and Khorasan lasted from around 642 to the Abbasid conquest in 760.

== History ==
The early history of the Dabuyids is recorded by Ibn Isfandiyar, a later historian. According to tradition, the Dabuyids were direct descendants of Jamasp, the son of Sasanian King of Kings Peroz I and the younger brother of Kavad I, making them a cadet branch of the House of Sassan. Jamasp's grandson Piruz invaded Gilan and expanded the family's authority by annexing Tabaristan. Piruz's relative Gil, also known as Gavbara (lit. "devotee of the Cow"), played a crucial role in this. As a result, Gil's son Dabuya (or Daboe) was officially given the titles of Gil e Gilan ("Ruler of Gilan") and Padashwargarshah ("King of Patashwargar", the former name of the mountains in Tabaristan) by the last king of kings of the Sasanian Empire, Yazdegerd III.

After the Muslim conquest of Persia, the nobles of the Houses of Ispahbudan and Karin signed peace treaties with the Arab armies. These treaties stipulated that the Arabs could not approach these territories without prior permission. As a result, Gavbara retained control over the regions of Gilan and at least parts of Tabaristan, while Farrokhzad of the House of Ispahbudan ruled over Rey and parts of Khorasan. After about 15 years, Ibn Isfandiyar records that Gavbara died and his son Dabuya ascended to the throne, thus naming the dynasty. After years of dynastic conflict between the Houses of Karin and Ispahbudan in northeastern Iran, Dabuya's son Farrukhan the Great successfully seized control of Tabaristan and advanced to the borders of Nishapur. In addition to the titles given by Yazdegerd III, the rulers of the Dabuyid dynasty also held the ancient Iranian military title of ispahbadh as their regnal title.

Farrukhan the Great defeated a major Muslim invasion led by Yazid ibn al-Muhallab from 716 to 717. Modern scholars place his rise to power in the 670s, rather than the early 710s as previously thought. Farrukhan died in 728 and his son Dadhburzmihr (Dadmihr) succeeded him as ruler. His reign is poorly documented and he died young in 740 or 741. When Khurshid was crowned Ispahbadh of Tabaristan, he was only a young boy and his uncle Farrukhan the Little served as regent for seven years until Khurshid reached adulthood. During his reign, Khurshid ruled a prosperous state and made numerous attempts to sever its ties with the Caliphate.

After the Abbasid revolution, a conflict arose between Khurshid and the Abbasid caliph Al-Mansur. In 759, Al-Mansur launched a campaign against the Dabuyid dynasty under the pretext of seeking Khurshid's help in suppressing a rebellion in Khorasan. Khurshid allowed Al-Mansur's forces to pass through Tabaristan but was caught off guard by a surprise attack that led to the invasion and subsequent fall of Tabaristan. After fleeing, Khurshid sought refuge in Gilan and attempted to gather his forces for a counterattack. However, when the king was captured in 761, his family committed suicide, ending the reign of the Dabuyid dynasty.

== Dabuyid rulers ==
Portrait	Title	Name	Birth	Family relations	Reign	Death	Notes
Dabuyid dynasty (642–760)
	Ispahbadh	Gil Gavbara	?	Son of Piruz	642–660	660	
	Ispahbadh, Gil-Gilan, Padashwargarshah	Dabuya	?	Son of Gil Gavbara	660–712	712	
	Ispahbadh, Gil-Gilan, Padashwargarshah	Farrukhan the Great	?	Son of Dabuya	712–728	728	
	Ispahbadh, Gil-Gilan, Padashwargarshah	Dadhburzmihr	?	Son of Farrukhan the Great	728–740/741	740/741	
	Ispahbadh, Gil-Gilan, Padashwargarshah	Farrukhan the Little	?	Son of Farrukhan the Great	740/741–747/48	747/48	Regent for Khurshid of Tabaristan
	Ispahbadh, Gil-Gilan, Padashwargarshah	Khurshid	734	Son of Dadhburzmihr	740/741–760	761	Committed suicide

== See also ==
- Padusbanids
- Bavand dynasty
- House of Ispahbudhan

== Sources ==
- Inostranzev, M. (1918) Iranian Influence on Moslem Literature – Appendix I: Independent Zoroastrian Princes of Tabaristan.
- Madelung, Wilferd (1993). "DABUYIDS". In Yarshater, Ehsan (ed.). Encyclopaedia Iranica, Vol. VI, Fasc. 5. London u.a.: Routledge & Kegan Paul. pp. 541–544. ISBN 1-56859-007-5.
- Pourshariati, Parvaneh (2008). Decline and Fall of the Sasanian Empire: The Sasanian-Parthian Confederacy and the Arab Conquest of Iran. London and New York: I.B. Tauris. ISBN 978-1-84511-645-3.
- Yavari, Neguin (2020). "Dābūyids". In Fleet, Kate; Krämer, Gudrun; Matringe, Denis; Nawas, John; Rowson, Everett (eds.). Encyclopaedia of Islam (3rd ed.). Brill Online. ISSN 1873-9830.
