= Parvaneh Pourshariati =

Iranian-born American historian (born 1959)

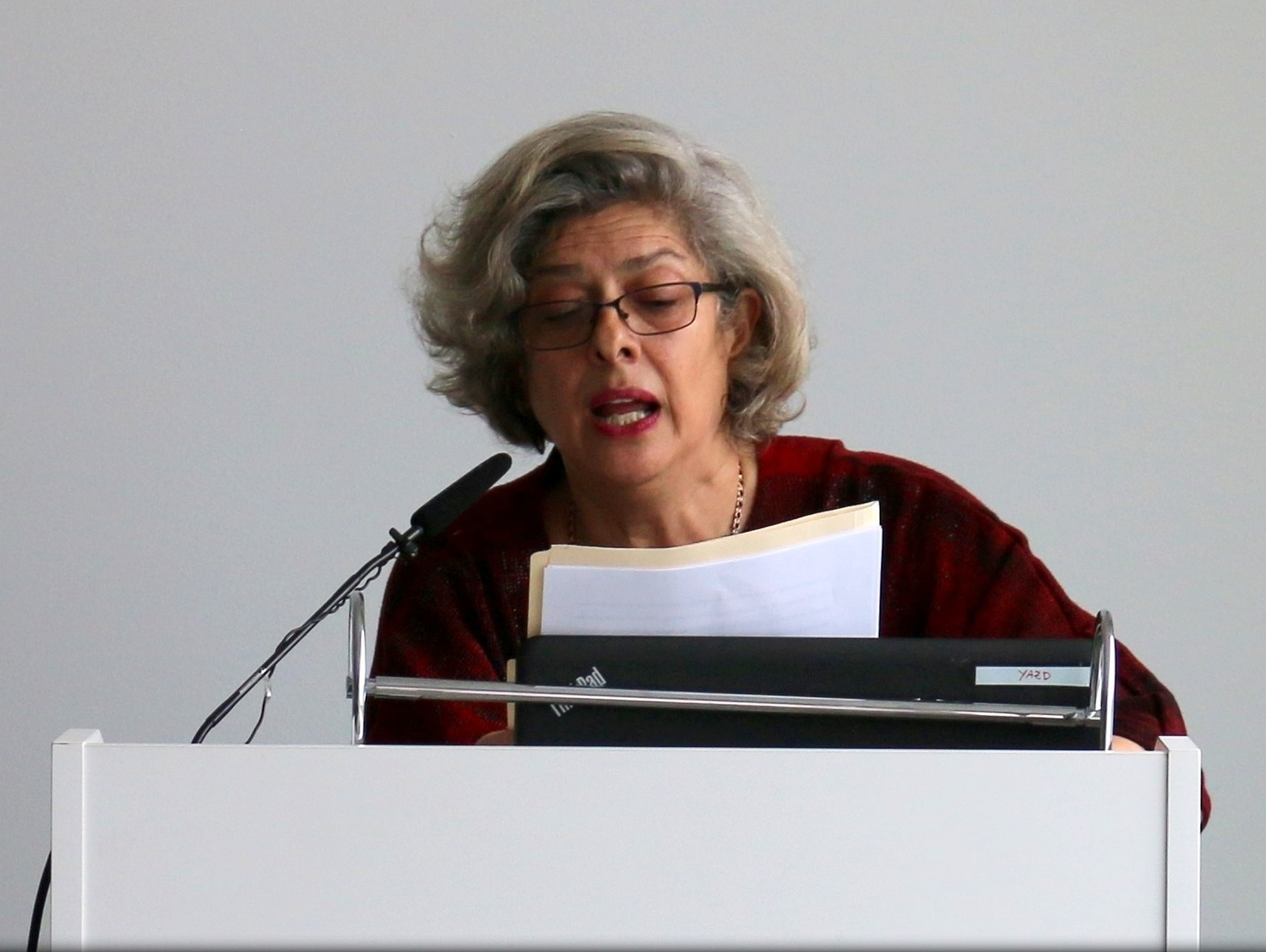
Pourshariati in 2019

Parvaneh Pourshariati (born 1959) is an Iranian-born American historian of Middle Eastern studies, scholar, and educator. She is an associate professor of history at New York City College of Technology (CUNY), and former president of the Association for the Study of Persianate Societies. She specializes in the late antique, early medieval and modern histories of Iran and the Middle East.

== Biography ==
Pourshariati was born in Tehran, Iran, in 1959. She received her master's degree from New York University (NYU) and her PhD from Columbia University. According to her profile page at CUNY, her research "focuses on the social and cultural history and interconnections of the Middle East, the Caucasus, Iran and Central Asia".

She is a member of the editorial board of the Journal of Persianate Studies and Iran Namag.

In 2006, in memory of her father, the late Houshang Pourshariati, Pourshariati established the bi-annual Houshang Pourshariati Iranian Studies Book Award, which has been administered through the Middle East Studies Association (MESA), ever since.

Pourshariati was a visiting fellow at Princeton University in Summer 2013 and a visiting scholar at Hebrew University of Jerusalem in 2012. In 2015 to 2016 she was a visiting research scholar at New York University. From 2000 to 2014 she served in the Department of Near Eastern Languages and Cultures at The Ohio State University.

She has been the Founder and Director of the Circle for Late Antique and Medieval Studies (CLAMS) at CUNY/GC, an interdisciplinary research forum that brings together leading scholars from around the world through lectures, workshops, and international collaborations.

== Research ==
Pourshariati's landmark monograph, Decline and Fall of the Sasanian Empire: The Sasanian-Parthian Confederacy and the Arab Conquest of Iran, fundamentally reexamined the political organization of the late Sasanian Empire and transformed scholarly debates concerning the Arab conquest of Iran and the political and social structure of Iran in the context of Late Antiquity. The work has been translated into Persian and Arabic. Fred Donner described the book as "a monumental work of first-class scholarship"; Stephen Dale characterized it as "a major, even pathbreaking, work"; and Hugh N. Kennedy called it "the most important re-examination of late Sasanian and early Islamic history since Christensen."

== Works ==
- Decline and Fall of the Sasanian Empire: The Sasanian-Parthian Confederacy and the Arab Conquest of Iran. IB Taurus. 2008.
- Pourshariati, Parvaneh (January 2024). "The Mazdakites, the ʿAyyārs and the Mithraists (Open Source)". دانش و خرد حماسی. 1 (Epic Knowledge and Wisdom). doi:10.22067/jmels.2024.85566.1016.
