= Ibn Isfandiyar =

13th century Iranian historian

- ابن اسفندیار
- Born: 13th century Tabaristan, Iran
- Died: c. 1220
- Occupations: Historian, Author

Academic work
- Era: Bavandid period
- Main interests: History, Genealogy
- Notable works: Tarikh-i Tabaristan

Baha al-Din Muhammad ibn Hasan ibn Isfandiyar (Persian: بهاءالدین محمد بن حسن بن اسفندیار), commonly known as Ibn Isfandiyar (ابن اسفندیار), was a 13th-century Iranian historian from Tabaristan who wrote a history of his native province, the Tarikh-i Tabaristan. What little is known of his life comes from the introduction of this work.

== Biography ==
Ibn Isfandiyar belonged to a prominent bureaucratic family from Amol, the capital of Tabaristan. His father Hasan was a high-ranking court official of the Bavandids, the ruling dynasty of Tabaristan. In his early career, Ibn Isfandiyar was a member of the court of the Bavandids and enjoyed the patronage of Ardashir I (died 1206). He began compiling material for his history in 1206, which up to then mainly consisted of the Bavand-nameh, a now-lost, presumably Persian work which Ibn Isfandiyar viewed as a Bavandid romance only.

In 1209, he travelled briefly to Baghdad. On his return, he stayed for two months in Ray, where he came across in Rustam ibn Shahriyar's library the Uqidu sihr wa-qala'idu durar of Abu 'l-Hasan Muhammad al-Yazdadi – an Arabic history of Tabaristan subsequently lost. Ibn Isfandiyar translated this work into Persian, and this, coupled with genealogical and historical information on the Bavandids, formed the core of his history. He added more material over the years, especially during his five-year stay in Khwarazm. His fate is unknown; he may have returned to his native Tabaristan and died there, or he may have perished in the Mongol sack of Khwarazm in 1220.

From 1216/17, Ibn Isfandiyar transposed the entire account of the Čahār maqāla covering Mahmud of Ghazni and Ferdowsi into his Tarikh-i Tabarestan. His history ends with the first fall of the Bavandid dynasty in 1210. An anonymous later author continued it up to 1349, when the dynasty’s second period ended, based chiefly on Awliya Allah Amuli's Tarikh-i Ruyan. Ibn Isfandiyar's work includes much unique historical, biographical and geographical information, including verses in Tabari language and a Persian translation of the Letter of Tansar, an important piece of Pahlavi literature, sent by the Sasanian ruler Ardashir I's chief priest to Gushnasp, prince of Tabaristan.

== Sources ==
- Madelung, W. (1984). "Āl-e Bāvand". In Yarshater, Ehsan (ed.). Encyclopædia Iranica. Vol. I/7: Ahriman–Alafrank. London and New York: Routledge & Kegan Paul. pp. 747–753. ISBN 978-0-71009-096-6.
- Melville, Charles (1997). "Ebn Esfandīār, Bahāʾ-al-Dīn Moḥammad". In Yarshater, Ehsan (ed.). Encyclopædia Iranica. Vol. VIII/1: Ebn ʿAyyāš–Economy V. London and New York: Routledge & Kegan Paul. pp. 20–23. ISBN 978-1-56859-050-9.
- Ghereghlou, Kioumars (2021). "Ibn Isfandiyār". In Fleet, Kate; Krämer, Gudrun; Matringe, Denis; Nawas, John; Rowson, Everett (eds.). Encyclopaedia of Islam (3rd ed.). Brill Online. ISSN 1873-9830.
- Van Donzel, Emeri Johannes (1994). Islamic Desk Reference. Leiden: E. J. Brill. ISBN 978-90-04-09738-4.
- Yarshater, E. (1971). "Ibn-i Isfandiyār". In Lewis, B.; Ménage, V. L.; Pellat, Ch. & Schacht, J. (eds.). The Encyclopaedia of Islam, Second Edition. Volume III: H–Iram. Leiden: E. J. Brill. p. 810. OCLC 495469525.
- Yūsofī, Ḡolām-Ḥosayn (2015). "ČAHĀR MAQĀLA". Encyclopaedia Iranica.
