= Spahbed =

Middle Persian army title

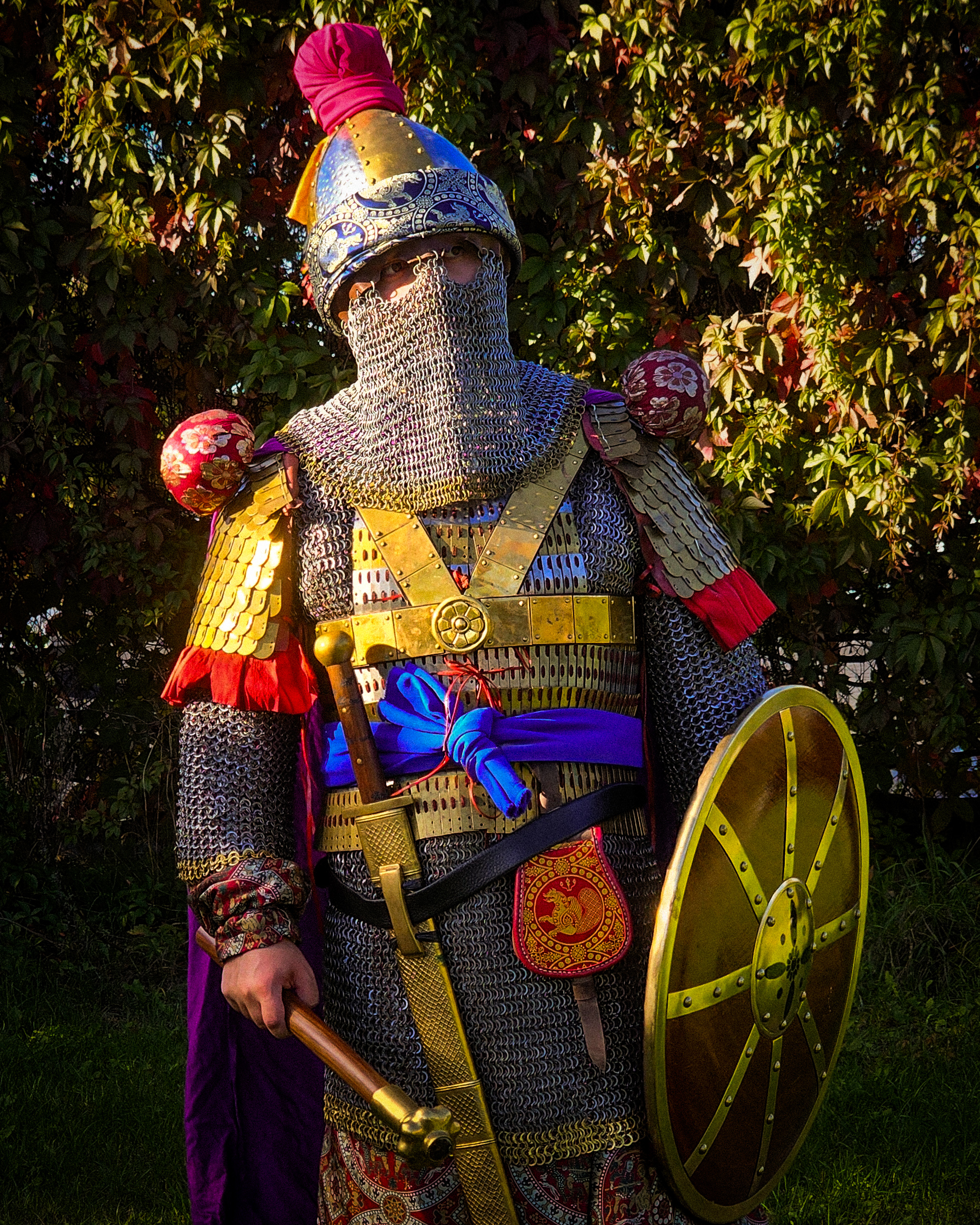
Modern reconstruction of a late Sassanian era "Spahbed" or Military Commander

Spāhbad (also spelled Spāhbed or Spāhbod) is a Middle Persian title meaning "army chief" or commander used chiefly in the Sasanian Empire. Originally there was a single spāhbad, called the Ērān-spāhbed, who functioned as the generalissimo of the Sasanian army. From the time of Khosrow I (r. 531–579) on, the office was split in four, with a spāhbad for each of the cardinal directions. After the Muslim conquest of Persia, the spāhbad of the East managed to retain his authority over the inaccessible mountainous region of Tabaristan on the southern shore of the Caspian Sea, where the title, often in its Islamic form ispahbadh (New Persian: اسپهبذ, romanized: ʾispahbaḏ, Arabic: اصبهبذ, romanized: ʾiṣbahbaḏ), survived as a regnal title until the Mongol conquests of the 13th century. An equivalent title of Persian origin, ispāhsālār or sipāhsālār, gained great currency across the Muslim world in the 10th–15th centuries.

The title was also adopted by the Armenians (սպարապետ, [a]sparapet) and the Georgians (სპასპეტი, spaspeti), as well as Khotan (spāta) and the Sogdians (spʾdpt) in Central Asia. It is also attested in Greek sources as aspabedēs (ἀσπαβέδης). The title was revived in the 20th century by the Pahlavi dynasty, in the Modern Persian form sipahbud (سپهبد), equivalent to a three-star Lieutenant General, ranking below artišbud (full General).

== Use in pre-Islamic Iran ==
The title is attested in the Achaemenid Empire in its Old Persian form, spādapati (from *spāda- "army" and *pati- "chief"), signifying the army's commander-in-chief. The title continued in use under the Arsacid Parthian Empire, where it seems to have been a hereditary position in one of the seven great houses of the Parthian nobility.

The Sasanian Empire, which succeeded the Arsacids, retained the title, which is attested in a series of inscriptions from the 3rd century, recorded in Middle Persian (Inscriptional Pahlavi script) as 𐭮𐭯𐭠𐭧𐭯𐭲𐭩 spʾhpty and 𐭮𐭯𐭠𐭧𐭯𐭲 spʾhpt (read as spāhbad) and in Parthian (Inscriptional Parthian script) as 𐭀𐭎𐭐𐭀𐭃𐭐𐭕𐭉 ʾspʾdpty and 𐭎𐭐𐭃𐭐𐭕𐭉 spdpty (read as (a)spāẟbad).

Until the early 6th century, there was a single holder of the title, the Ērān-spāhbad, who according to the list of precedence provided by the 9th-century Muslim historian Ya'qubi occupied the fifth position in the court hierarchy. Two spahbads, both named Raxš, are recorded in Shapur-KZ and Paikuli inscriptions.

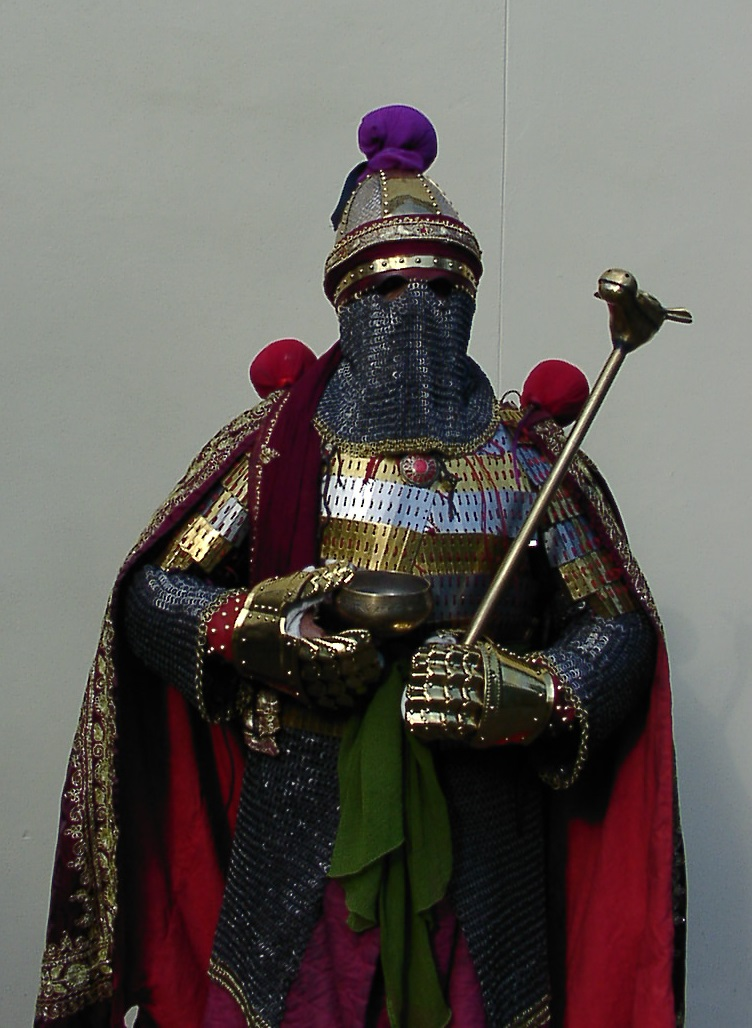
Modern reconstruction of late Sassanian-era military commander.

The Byzantine and Syriac sources record a number of senior officers who might be holders of the rank in the early 6th century. Thus during the Anastasian War of 502–506, a certain Boes (Bōē), who negotiated with the Byzantine magister officiorum Celer and died in 505, is named in the Syriac sources as an 'astable' (also spelled astabed, astabad, astabadh). His unnamed successor in the negotiations also bore this title. Some modern scholars have interpreted astabad as a new office corresponding to the Byzantine magister officiorum, supposedly instituted by Kavadh I shortly before 503 for the purpose of weakening the authority of the wuzurg framadar. But it is likely that this Syriac word is simply a corrupted form of spāhbed (which is normally recorded as aspabid in Syriac), or possibly asp(a)bad ("chief of the cavalry"), since the Greek sources give the name of the second man as Aspebedes (Latin: Aspebedus), Aspevedes, or Aspetios (Latin: Aspetius). Again, during the Iberian War (526–532), a man named Aspebedes (i.e. Bawi), according to the historian Procopius a maternal uncle of Khosrow I (r. 531–579), appears. In 527 he took part in negotiations with Byzantine envoys, and in 531 he led an invasion of Mesopotamia along with Chanaranges and Mermeroes. He was executed by Khosrow shortly after his accession for plotting with other nobles to overthrow him in favor of his brother Zames.

=== Khosrow I's reform ===
To curb the power of the over-mighty generalissimo, Khosrow I —valthough this reform may already have been planned by his father, Kavad I (r. 499–531) — split the office of the Ērān-spāhbad into four regional commands, corresponding to the four traditional cardinal directions (kust, cf. Šahrestānīhā ī Ērānšahr): the "army chief of the East (Khorasan)" (kust ī xwarāsān spāhbad), the "army chief of the South" (kust ī nēmrōz spāhbad), the "army chief of the West" (kust ī xwarbārān spāhbad), and the "army chief of Azerbaijan" (kust ī Ādurbādagān spāhbad, where the northwestern province of Azerbaijan substitutes the term "north" because of the latter's negative connotations). The exact geographical definition of each command has been retrieved from Anania Shirakatsi's Ashkharhatsuyts (lit. 'Geography'). As this reform was mentioned only in later literary sources, the historicity of this division, or its survival after Khosrow I's reign, was questioned in the past, but a series of thirteen recently discovered seals, which provide the names of eight spāhbads, provide contemporary evidence from the reigns of Khosrow I and his successor, Hormizd IV (r. 579–590); P. Pourshariati suggests that two may date to the reign of Khosrow II (r. 590–628). The eight known spāhbads are:

Name	Command	King	Family	Other titles
Chihr-Burzēn (Simah-i Burzin)	East	Khosrow I	Kārin	
Dād-Burzēn-Mihr (Wuzurgmihr)	East	Hormizd IV	Kārin	aspbed ī pāhlav
Wahrām Ādurmāh (Bahram-i Mah Adhar)	South	Khosrow I & Hormizd IV	Unknown	šahr-hazāruft (under Hormizd IV only), nēwānbed, šābestan
Wēh-Shāpūr	South	Khosrow I	Unknown	aspbed ī pārsīg
Pīrag	South	Khosrow II	Mihrān	Shahrwarāz
Wistakhm (Vistahm)	West	Khosrow II & Hormizd IV	Ispahbudhān	Hazarbed
Gōrgōn or Gōrgēn (Golon Mihran)	North	Khosrow I	Mihrān	
Sēd-hōsh (?)	North	Khosrow I	Mihrān	šahr-aspbed

Other holders of the rank are difficult to identify from the literary sources, since the office of spāhbed was held in tandem with other offices and titles, such as Shahrwarāz ("Boar of the Empire"), which are often treated as personal names. A further factor of confusion in later literary sources is the interchangeable use of the rank with the junior provincial ranks of marzbān ("frontier-warden, margrave") and pāygōsbān ("district guardian").

== Islamic period ==
=== Tabaristan ===
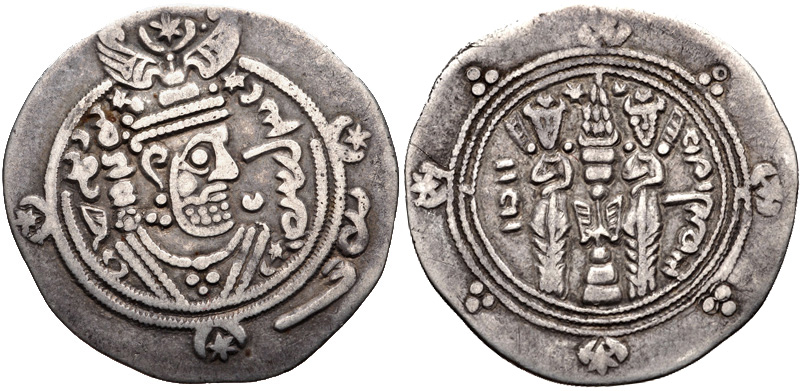
Silver dirham of the last Dabuyid ispahbadh, Khurshid of Tabaristan (r. 740–761)

During the Muslim conquest of Persia, the spahbad of Khurasan apparently retired to the mountains of Tabaristan. There he invited the last Sasanian shah, Yazdgerd III, to find refuge, but Yazdgerd refused, and was killed in 651. Like many other local rulers throughout the former Sasanian domains, including those of the neighboring provinces of Gurgan and Gilan, the spahbad then made terms with the Arabs, which allowed him to remain as the practically independent ruler of Tabaristan in exchange for an annual tribute. This marked the foundation of the Dabuyid dynasty, which ruled Tabaristan until 759–761, when it was conquered by the Abbasids and incorporated into the Caliphate as a province. The early rulers of the dynasty are ill-attested; they minted coins of their own with Pahlavi legends and a dating system starting from the Sasanian dynasty's fall in 651 and claimed the titles Gīlgīlan, Padashwargarshah ("Shah of Patashwargar", the old name of Tabaristan's mountains), and ispahbadh (اسپهبذ, a New Persian form of spahbad) of Khurasan.

The title ispahbadh was also claimed by other lines of local rulers in the region, who claimed distant descent from the Sasanian past: the Karen family, who saw themselves as heirs of the Dabuyids and ruled central and western Tabaristan until 839/840, and the Bavandid dynasty in the eastern mountains, whose various branches survived until well after the Mongol conquests of the 13th century. The title was also used by the Daylamites neighbouring Tabaristan and the Ispahbads of Gilan. In some later texts from this region, the title came to signify simply a local chieftain.

=== Central Asia ===
In Khurasan, the title survived in usage among the local Soghdian princes. The ispahbadh of Balkh is mentioned in 709, al-Ishkand, the ispahbadh of Nasa in 737, and the same title is used in connection with the king of Kabul in the early 9th century. In the 1090s, it appears as the personal name of a Seljuk commander, Isfabadh ibn Sawtigin, who seized control of Mecca for a while.

== In Armenia ==
The Kingdom of Armenia, which was ruled by a branch of the Parthian Arsacid dynasty, adopted the term first in its Old Persian form, giving Armenian [a]sparapet and then again, under Sasanian influence, from the Middle Persian form, giving the form aspahapet. The title was used, as in Persia, for the commander-in-chief of the royal army, and was borne in hereditary right by the Mamikonian family.

== In Georgia ==
The institution of the Georgian rank spaspet, like its rough equivalent sparapet in neighboring Armenia, was designed under the influence of the Sasanian Persian spahbad, but differed in that it was a non-hereditary rank and included not only military but also civil functions.

According to the medieval Georgian chronicles, the rank of spaspet was introduced by the first king P’arnavaz in the 3rd century BC. The office, in a variously modified manner, survived into medieval and early modern Georgia down to the Russian annexation early in the 19th century.

== Bibliography ==
- Bosworth, C. E. (1978). "Ispahbed̲h̲". In van Donzel, E.; Lewis, B.; Pellat, Ch. & Bosworth, C. E. (eds.). The Encyclopaedia of Islam, Second Edition. Volume IV: Iran–Kha. Leiden: E. J. Brill. pp. 207–208. ISBN 978-90-04-05745-6. OCLC 758278456.
- Chaumont, M. L. (1987). "ASTABED". In Yarshater, Ehsan (ed.). Encyclopædia Iranica. Vol. II/8: Aśoka IV–Āṯār al-Wozarāʾ. London and New York: Routledge & Kegan Paul. pp. 825–826. ISBN 978-0-71009-108-6.
- Daryaee, Touraj (2009). Sasanian Persia: The Rise and Fall of an Empire. London and New York: I.B. Tauris. ISBN 978-1-85043-898-4.
- Gyselen, Rika (20 July 2004). "SPĀHBED". In Yarshater, Ehsan (ed.). Encyclopædia Iranica (Online ed.). Encyclopædia Iranica Foundation.
- Kennedy, Hugh (2007). The Great Arab Conquests: How the Spread of Islam Changed the World We Live In. Philadelphia, Pennsylvania: Da Capo Press. ISBN 978-0-306-81740-3.
- Madelung, W. (1975). "The Minor Dynasties of Northern Iran". In Frye, Richard N. (ed.). The Cambridge History of Iran: From the Arab Invasion to the Saljuqs. Vol. 4. Cambridge: Cambridge University Press. pp. 198–249. ISBN 0-521-20093-8.
- Martindale, John R., ed. (1980). The Prosopography of the Later Roman Empire: Volume II, AD 395–527. Cambridge: Cambridge University Press. ISBN 0-521-20159-4.
- Martindale, John R., ed. (1992). The Prosopography of the Later Roman Empire: Volume III, AD 527–641. Cambridge: Cambridge University Press. ISBN 0-521-20160-8.
- Pourshariati, Parvaneh (2008). Decline and Fall of the Sasanian Empire: The Sasanian-Parthian Confederacy and the Arab Conquest of Iran. London and New York: I.B. Tauris. ISBN 978-1-84511-645-3.
