= Sasanian civil war of 589–591 =

Civil war between Hormizd IV and Bahram Chobin

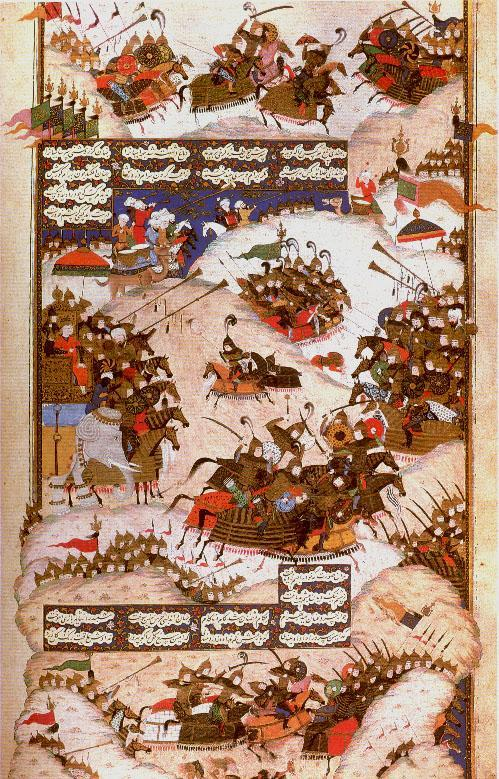
- Medieval Iranian art illustrating Khosrow II and Bahram Chobin in a battle
Date	589–591
Location	Sasanian Empire territories
Result	The faction of Khosrow II emerges victorious
Territorial changes	Khosrow II gives the Byzantine Empire most of Armenia and the western half of Iberia

Belligerents
Supporters of Bahram Chobin	Sasanian Empire	Dissatisfied Sasanian nobles Allies: Byzantine Empire (590–591)

Commanders and leaders
Bahram Chobin †; Zatsparham †; Bryzacius (executed); Bahram Siyavashan †; Mardansina; Zoarab (590-591); Zadespras † (590–591)	Hormizd IV (executed); Azen Gushnasp †; Sarames the Elder †; Pherochanes †; Zadespras (590); Zoarab (589-590); Sarames the Younger (589-590)	Khosrow II; Vistahm; Vinduyih; Mahbodh; Sarames the Younger (590-591); Mushegh II Mamikonian; Maurice; Comentiolus; John Mystacon; Narses

The Sasanian civil war of 589–591 was a conflict that broke out in 589, due to the great deal of dissatisfaction among the nobles towards the rule of Hormizd IV. The civil war lasted until 591, ending with the overthrow of the Mihranid usurper Bahram Chobin and the restoration of the Sasanian family as the rulers of Iran.

Hormizd IV's distrust and harsh treatment of nobility and clergy was a major cause of the war. This eventually made Bahram Chobin start a major rebellion, while the two Ispahbudhan brothers Vistahm and Vinduyih made a palace coup against him, resulting in the blinding and eventually death of Hormizd IV. His son, Khosrow II, was thereafter crowned as king.

However, this did not change the mind of Bahram Chobin, who wanted to restore Parthian rule in Iran. Khosrow II was eventually forced to flee to Byzantine territory, where he made an alliance with the Byzantine emperor Maurice against Bahram Chobin. In 591, Khosrow II and his Byzantine allies invaded Bahram Chobin's territories in Mesopotamia, where they successfully managed to defeat him, while Khosrow II regained the throne. Bahram Chobin thereafter fled to the territory of the Turks in Transoxiana, but was not long afterwards assassinated or executed at the instigation of Khosrow II.

== Background ==
When Khosrow I ascended the Sasanian throne in 531, he began a series of reforms that was started by his father and predecessor Kavadh I. These reforms were mostly aimed at the elites of the Sasanian Empire, who had become too powerful and had been able to depose several Sasanian rulers. Khosrow was quite successful in these reforms, and after his death in 579, he was succeeded by his son Hormizd IV, who continued his father's policies, but in a harsher way; in order to control the elites, he, in the words of Shapur Shahbazi, "resorted to harshness, denigration, and execution." Hormizd was extremely hostile to the elites and did not trust them; therefore, he constantly sided with the lower classes.

Hormizd also declined the requests of the Zoroastrian priesthood to persecute the Christians. He did not like the Zoroastrian priesthood, and therefore killed a great deal of them, including the chief priest (mowbed) himself. Furthermore, Hormizd greatly reduced the pay of the military by 10 percent and massacred many powerful and prominent members of the elite, including the famous Karenid vizier of his father, Bozorgmehr, the latter's brother Simah-i Burzin; the Mihranid Izadgushasp; the spahbed ("army chief") Bahram-i Mah Adhar, and the Ispahbudhan Shapur, who was the father of Vistahm and Vinduyih. According to the medieval Persian historian al-Tabari, Hormizd is said to have ordered the death of 13,600 nobles and religious members.

== Outbreak of the civil war ==
=== The rebellion of Bahram Chobin ===
In 588, a massive Hephthalite-Turkic army invaded the Sasanian province Harev. Bahram Chobin, a military genius from the House of Mihran, was appointed as the spahbed of the kust of Khorasan. He was thereafter appointed as the head of an army of 12,000 soldiers. He then made a counter-attack against the Turks, and successfully defeated them, killing their ruler Bagha Qaghan (known as Shawa/Sava/Saba in Sasanian sources). After some time, Bahram was defeated by the Byzantine Empire in a battle on the banks of the Aras River. Hormizd IV, who was jealous of Bahram Chobin, used this defeat as an excuse to dismiss Bahram Chobin from his office, and had him humiliated.

=== The coup in Ctesiphon and the march of Bahram Chobin ===
Bahram, infuriated by Hormizd's actions, responded by rebelling, and due to his noble status and great military knowledge, was joined by his soldiers and many others. He then appointed a new governor for Khorasan, and afterwards set for Ctesiphon. This marked the first time in Sasanian history that a Parthian dynasty challenged the legitimacy of the Sasanian family by rebelling. Azen Gushnasp was sent to suppress the rebellion, but was murdered in Hamadan by one of his own men, Zadespras. Another force under Sarames the Elder was also sent to stop Bahram, who defeated him and had him trampled to death by elephants. The route taken by Bahram was presumably the northern edge of the Iranian plateau, where he repelled a Roman-funded attack by Iberians and others on Adurbadagan, and suffered a minor setback by a Roman force employed in Transcaucasia. He then marched southwards to Media, where Sasanian monarchs, including Hormizd, ordinarily resided during summer.

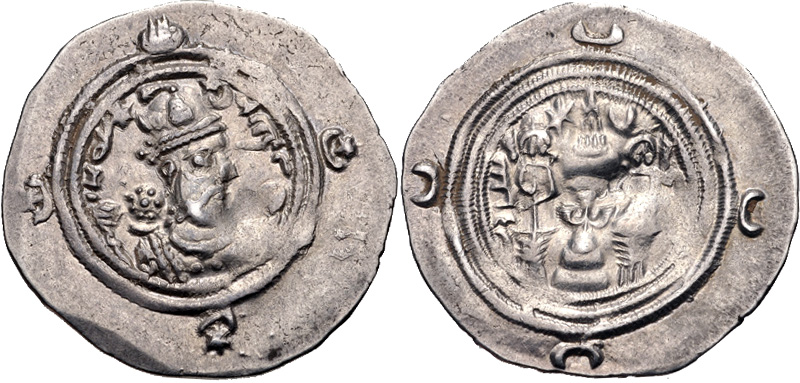
Coin of Khosrow II, minted in 590.

Hormizd then left for the Great Zab in order to cut transmissions between Ctesiphon and the Iranian soldiers on the Roman border. Around that time the soldiers were situated outside Nisibis, the chief Iranian city in northern Mesopotamia; they however also rebelled against Hormizd and pledged their allegiance to Bahram. The influence and popularity of Bahram continued to grow increasingly; Sasanian loyalist forces sent north against the Iranian rebels at Nisibis were flooded with rebel propaganda. The loyalist forces eventually also rebelled and killed their commander, which made the position of Hormizd unsustainable, making him decide to navigate the Tigris river and take sanctuary in al-Hira, the capital of the Lakhmids.

However, during Hormizd's stay at Ctesiphon, he was overthrown in a seemingly bloodless palace revolution by his brothers-in-law Vistahm and Vinduyih, "who equally hated Hormizd". Hormizd was shortly blinded with a red-hot needle by the two brothers, who put Hormizd's oldest son Khosrow II (who was their nephew through his mother's side) on the throne. The two brothers shortly had Hormizd killed with at least the implicit approval of Khosrow II. Nevertheless, Bahram continued his march to Ctesiphon, now with the pretext of claiming to avenge Hormizd.

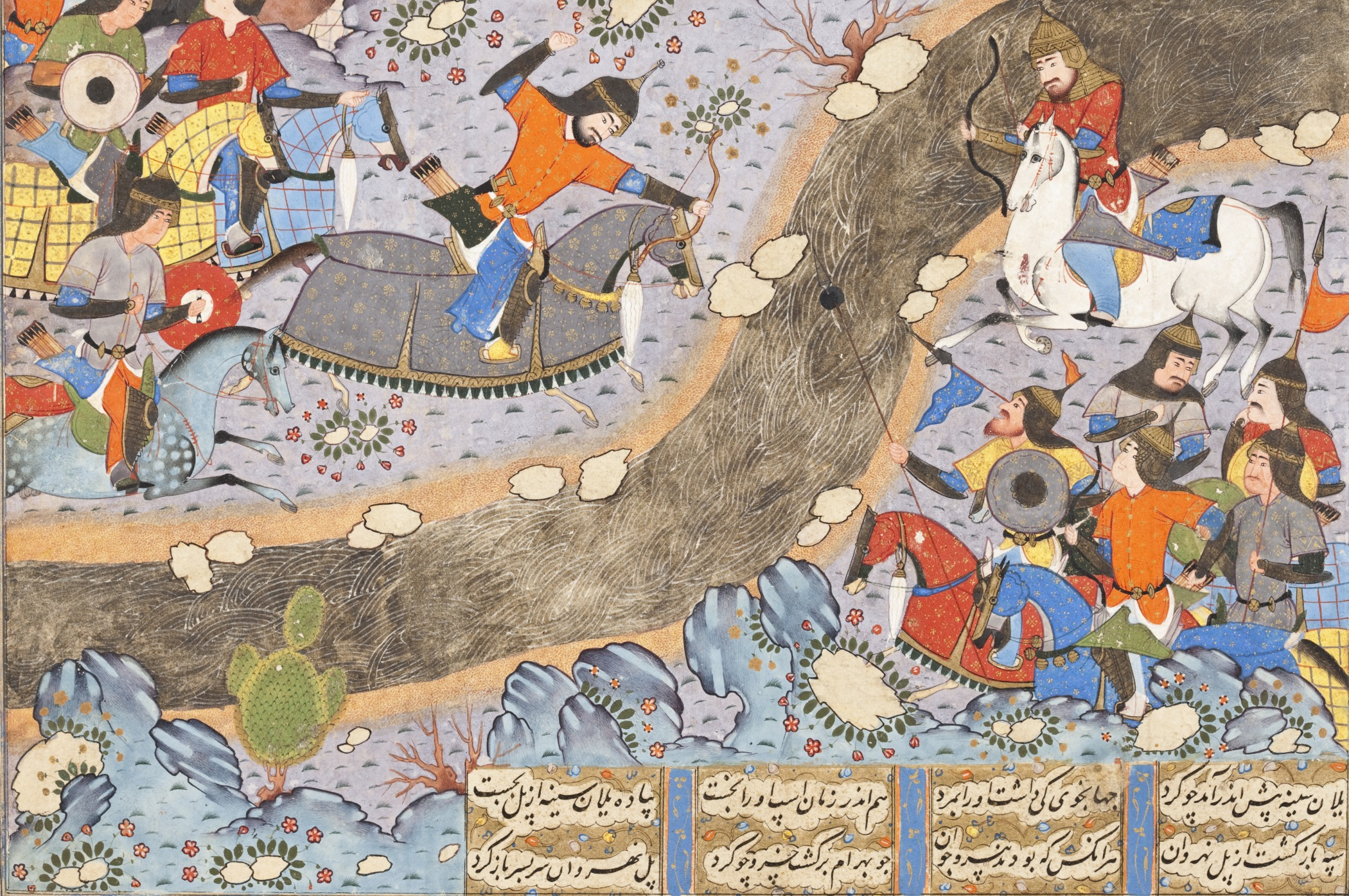
Bahram Chobin fighting Sasanian loyalists near Ctesiphon.

Khosrow then took a carrot and stick attitude, and wrote the following to Bahram; "Khosrow, king of kings, ruler over the ruling, lord of the peoples, prince of peace, salvation of men, among gods the good and eternally living man, among men the most esteemed god, the highly illustrious, the victor, the one who rises with the sun and who lends the night his eyesight, the one famed through his ancestors, the king who hates, the benefactor who engaged the Sasanians and saved the Iranians their kingship—to Bahram, the general of the Iranians, our friend.... We have also taken over the royal throne in a lawful manner and have upset no Iranian customs.... We have so firmly decided not to take off the diadem that we even expected to rule over other worlds, if this were possible.... If you wish your welfare, think about what is to be done."

Bahram, however, ignored his warning, and a few days later he reached the Nahrawan Canal near Ctesiphon, where he fought Khosrow's men, who were heavily outnumbered but managed to hold Bahram's men back in several clashes. However, Khosrow's men eventually began losing their morale and were in the end defeated by Bahram Chobin's forces. Khosrow, together with his two uncles, his wives, and a retinue of 30 nobles, thereafter fled to Byzantine territory, while Ctesiphon fell to Bahram Chobin.

=== Khosrow's flight to Byzantium and restoration ===
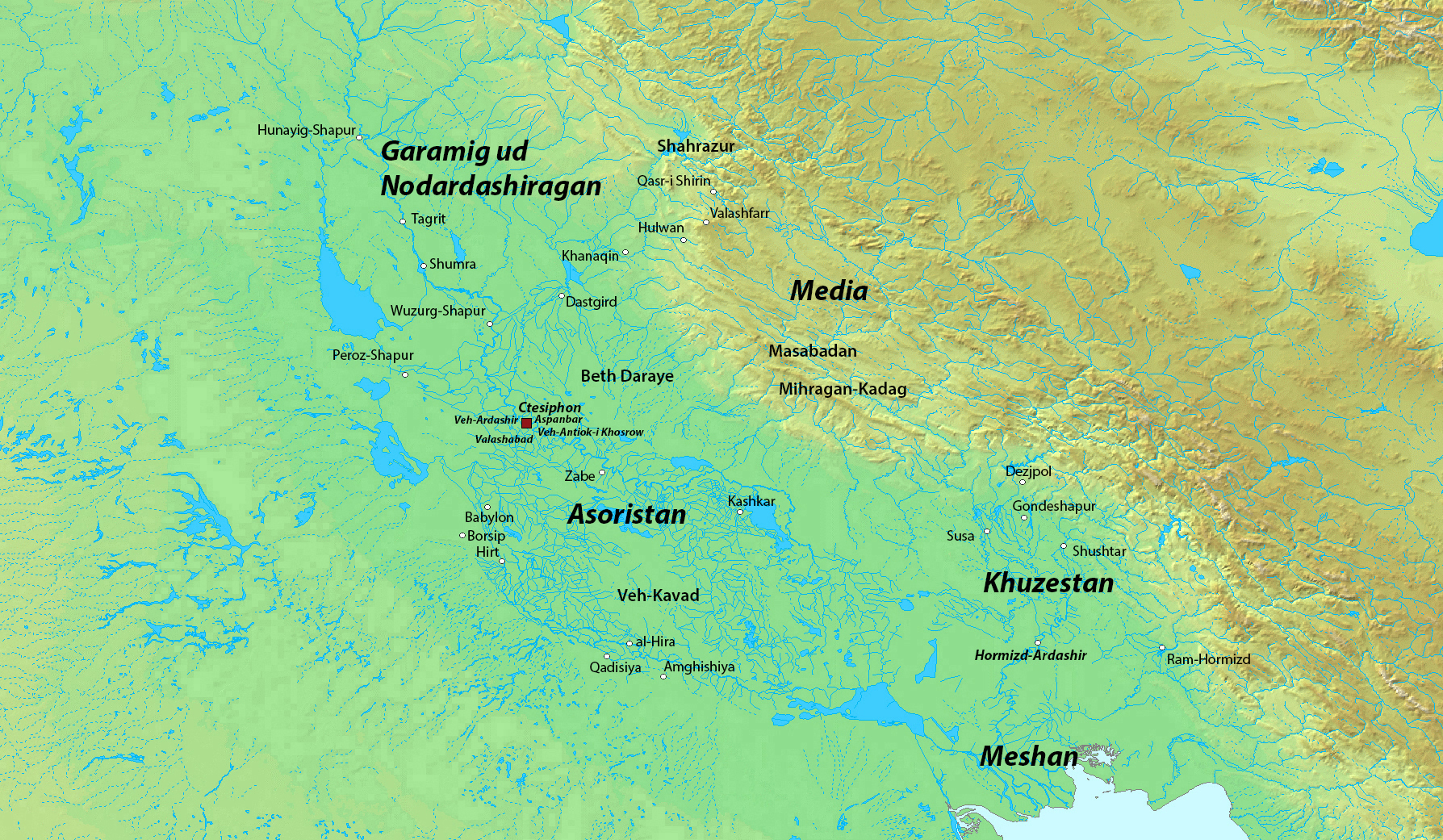
Map of Sasanian Mesopotamia and its surroundings.

In order to get the attention of the Byzantine emperor Maurice (r. 582–602), Khosrow II went to Syria, and sent a message to the Sasanian occupied city of Martyropolis to stop their resistance against the Byzantines, but with no avail. He then sent a message to Maurice, and requested his help to regain the Sasanian throne, which the Byzantine emperor agreed with; in return, the Byzantines would re-gain sovereignty over the cities of Amida, Carrhae, Dara and Martyropolis. Furthermore, Iran was required to stop intervening in the affairs of Iberia and Armenia, effectively ceding control of Lazica to the Byzantines.

In 591, Khosrow moved to Constantia and prepared to invade Bahram Chobin's territories in Mesopotamia, while Vistahm and Vinduyih were raising an army in Azerbaijan under the observation of the Byzantine commander John Mystacon, who was also raising an army in Armenia. After some time, Khosrow, along with the Byzantine commander of the south, Comentiolus, invaded Mesopotamia. During this invasion, Nisibis and Martyropolis quickly defected to them, and Bahram's commander Zatsparham was defeated and killed. One of Bahram's other commanders, Bryzacius, was captured in Mosul and had his nose and ears cut off, and was thereafter sent to Khosrow, where he was killed.

Some time later, Khosrow, feeling disrespected by Comentiolus, convinced Maurice to replace the latter with Narses as the commander of the south. Khosrow and Narses then penetrated deeper into Bahram's territory, seizing Dara and then Mardin in February, where Khosrow was re-proclaimed king. Shortly after this, Khosrow sent one of his Iranian supporters, Mahbodh, to capture Ctesiphon, which he managed to accomplish.

Meanwhile, Khosrow's two uncles and John Mystacon conquered northern Azerbaijan and went further south in the region, where they defeated Bahram at Blarathon. Bahram then fled to the Turks of Ferghana. However, Khosrow managed to deal with him by either having him assassinated or convincing the Turks to execute him.

== Aftermath ==
Map of the Roman-Sasanian frontier during Late Antiquity, including the 591 border between the two empires.

Peace with the Byzantines was then officially made. Maurice, for his aid, received much of Sasanian Armenia and western Georgia, and received the abolition of tribute which had formerly been paid to the Sasanians. This marked the beginning of a peaceful period between the two empires, which lasted until 602, when Khosrow decided to declare war against the Byzantines after the murder of Maurice by the usurper Phocas.

== Sources ==
- Al-Tabari, Abu Ja'far Muhammad ibn Jarir (1985–2007). Ehsan Yar-Shater (ed.). The History of Al-Ṭabarī. Vol. 40 vols. Albany, NY: State University of New York Press.
- Crawford, Peter (2013). The War of the Three Gods: Romans, Persians and the Rise of Islam. Pen and Sword. ISBN 9781848846128.
- Foss, Clive (1975). "The Persians in Asia Minor and the End of Antiquity". The English Historical Review. 90. Oxford University Press: 721–47. doi:10.1093/ehr/XC.CCCLVII.721.
- Greatrex, Geoffrey; Lieu, Samuel N. C. (2002). The Roman Eastern Frontier and the Persian Wars (Part II, 363–630 AD). New York, New York and London, United Kingdom: Routledge (Taylor & Francis). ISBN 0-415-14687-9.
- Howard-Johnston, James (2010). "ḴOSROW II". Encyclopaedia Iranica, Online Edition.
- Kia, Mehrdad (2016). The Persian Empire: A Historical Encyclopedia [2 volumes]: A Historical Encyclopedia. ABC-CLIO. ISBN 978-1610693912.
- Martindale, John Robert; Jones, Arnold Hugh Martin; Morris, J., eds. (1992). The Prosopography of the Later Roman Empire, Volume III: A.D. 527–641. Cambridge, United Kingdom: Cambridge University Press. ISBN 978-0-521-20160-5.
- Oman, Charles (1893). Europe, 476-918, Volume 1. Macmillan.
- Potts, Daniel T. (2014). Nomadism in Iran: From Antiquity to the Modern Era. London and New York: Oxford University Press. pp. 1–558. ISBN 9780199330799.
- Pourshariati, Parvaneh (2008). Decline and Fall of the Sasanian Empire: The Sasanian-Parthian Confederacy and the Arab Conquest of Iran. London and New York: I.B. Tauris. ISBN 978-1-84511-645-3.
- Rawlinson, George (2004). The Seven Great Monarchies of the Ancient Eastern World. Gorgias Press LLC. ISBN 9781593331719.
- Rezakhani, Khodadad (2017). "East Iran in Late Antiquity". ReOrienting the Sasanians: East Iran in Late Antiquity. Edinburgh University Press. pp. 1–256. ISBN 978-1-4744-0030-5. JSTOR 10.3366/j.ctt1g04zr8. (registration required)
- Shahbazi, A. Shapur (1988). "BAHRĀM (2)". Encyclopaedia Iranica, Vol. III, Fasc. 5. pp. 514–522.
- Shahbazi, A. Shapur (1989). "BESṬĀM O BENDŌY". Encyclopaedia Iranica, Vol. IV, Fasc. 2. pp. 180–182.
- Shahbazi, A. Shapur (2004). "Hormozd iv". Encyclopaedia Iranica, Vol. XII, Fasc. 5. pp. 466–467.
- Shahbazi, A. Shapur (2005). "Sasanian dynasty". Encyclopaedia Iranica, Online Edition.
- Soward, Warren (24 September 2023). Theophylact Simocatta and the Persians (PDF). Sasanika. Archived from the original (PDF) on 26 February 2015.
