= Zoarab =

King of the Daylamites in late 6th century

Zoarab was king of the Daylamites in the late 6th century. He is first mentioned in 590, when he together with Sarames the Younger, betrayed the Sasanian king Hormizd IV (r. 579–590) by murdering his general Pherochanes. Zoarab then joined the rebellion of Bahram Chobin, while Sarames joined a group of dissatisfied nobles led by Vistahm and Vinduyih.

Bahram Chobin managed to briefly become king of the Sasanian Empire from 590 until he was defeated and killed in 591. Hormizd IV's son Khosrow II thereafter became king, but Vistahm later rebelled himself; Zoarab joined his rebellion, which lasted from 591 to 596 or from 594/5 to 600.

== Sources ==
- Greatrex, Geoffrey; Lieu, Samuel N. C. (2002). The Roman Eastern Frontier and the Persian Wars (Part II, 363–630 AD). London, United Kingdom: Routledge. ISBN 0-415-14687-9.
- Warren, Soward. Theophylact Simocatta and the Persians (PDF). Sasanika. Archived from the original (PDF) on 2015-02-26.
- Wilferd Madelung, Wolfgang Felix (1995). "DEYLAMITES". Encyclopaedia Iranica, Vol. BII, Fasc. 4. pp. 342–347.
