= Battle of the Araxes (589) =

- Part of Byzantine–Sasanian War of 572–591
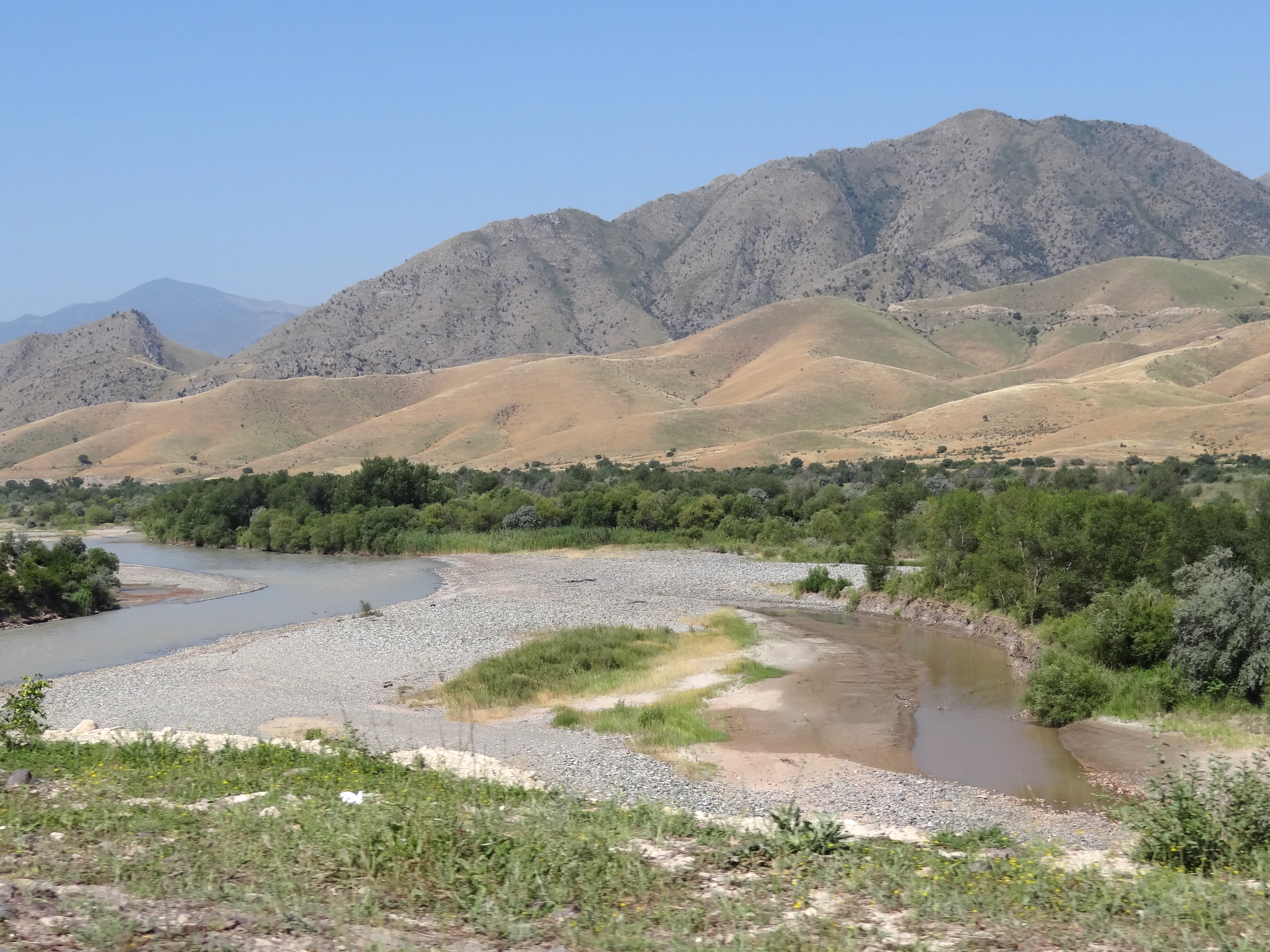
- Modern view of the Aras river, near the Iranian border with Karabakh
Date	Summer & Autumn 589
Location	Araxes river, Caucasian Albania
Result	Byzantine victory

Belligerents
Byzantine Empire	Sasanian Empire

Commanders and leaders
Romanus	Bahram Chobin

Strength
Around 10,000 total 2,000 in the vanguard	More than 20,000 total

Casualties and losses
Light	Several thousands Sasanian vanguard annihilated

The battle of the Araxes was fought in 589 between the Byzantine and Sasanian Empires in Transcaucasia, and was part of the wider War for the Caucasus. The result was a significant defeat for the Sasanians, notably marking the first battlefield defeat of the Parthian general Bahram Chobin.

== Background ==
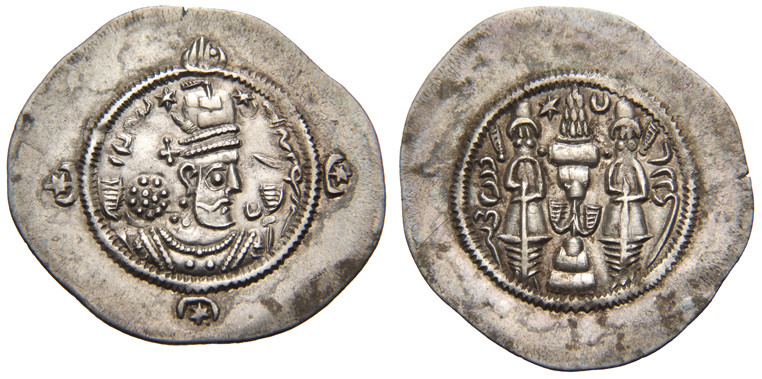
Silver coin depicting Hormizd IV

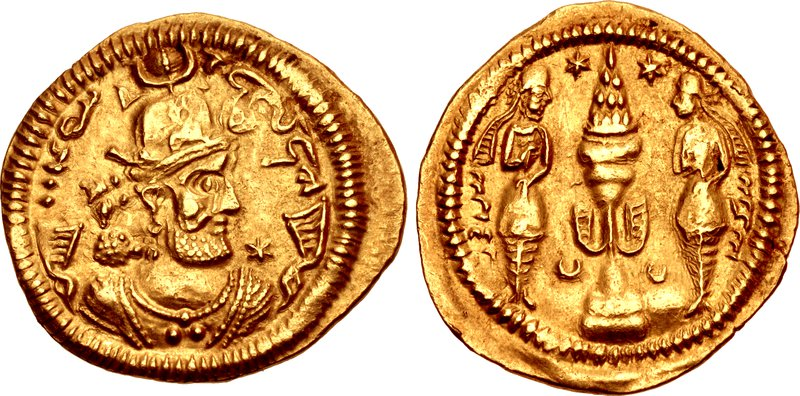
Golden coin depicting Bahram Chobin

In 588, the Sasanians had been forced to respond to a major attack on their eastern possessions by the Onoq Khaganate. The military situation was acute, as the Persians were simultaneously occupied in the west with their war against the Byzantines that had been ongoing since 572, and had exhausted their Empire. In this situation the Shahenshah Hormizd IV was forced to appoint Bahram Chobin, a member of the powerful Mihranid clan, as Spahbod of the East to take command of the war against the Turks in Khorasan and Transoxiana. Bahram's command in the east proved highly successful, with the Persians decisively defeating the invading Turkic armies of the Khaganate in a series of battles. By 4 April 589, the campaign in the east had ended in a complete Sasanian victory, allowing the Persians to focus their efforts westward against the Byzantines.

== Caucasian Campaign of Bahram Chobin ==
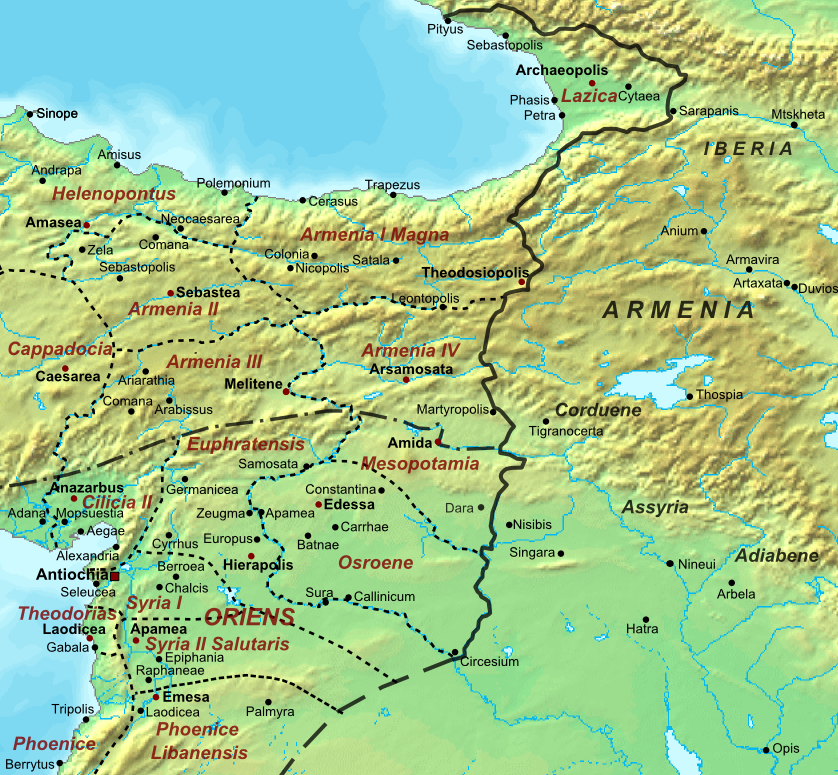
The Roman-Sasanian frontier in 565

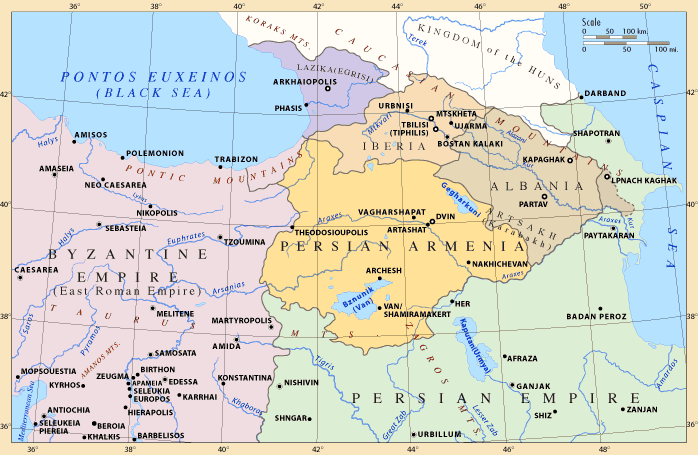
The Caucasus in the late 4th to late 6th centuries

In 589, the Byzantine forces in Iberia had exploited the transferral of Persian forces in the east, as well as a significant victory of the Byzantine armies in the Battle of Martyropolis, to conduct offensive operations against the Sasanians. A Byzantine army and a separate column of Iberian-Alan allies invaded Sasanian territory, pillaging lands in the Caucasus before descending into Media and devastating it too. Simultaneously, an army of nomads called the Mazkutk in Sebeos' account (likely denoting a Hunnic or Turkic tribe), invaded Sasanian territory from the north and ravaged Albania.

These developments prompted a response from the Sasanians. Following his victory over the Turks, Bahram Chobin advanced westward against enemy forces ravaging the Caucasus. Bahram was able to intercept the Mazkutk nomads and soundly defeat them. This victory bolstered Bahram's military reputation and news of it prompted the Iberian and Byzantine columns to withdraw from Media. Bahram exploited this victory by marching against Iberian possessions in Suania, pillaging the territory. Some of the plundered loot was dispatched to the Shahenshah in Ctesiphon, though this display only furthered Hormizd's suspicion towards his victorious general.

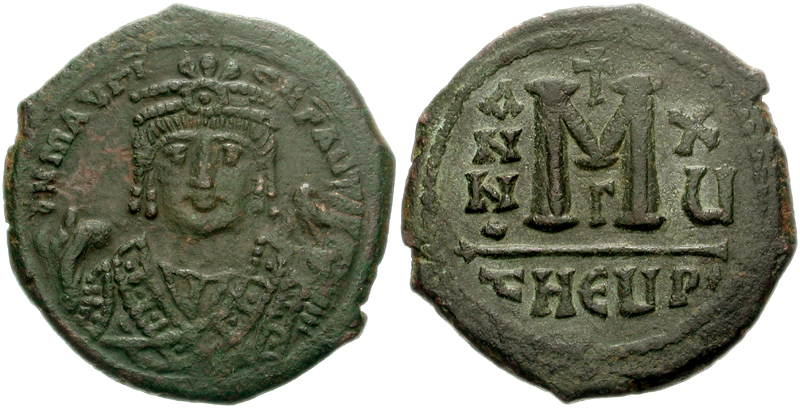
Follis of Maurice in consular uniform

News of the raid in Suania soon reached Emperor Maurice. In response, he appointed Romanus as commander of the Byzantine forces in Iberia. Upon reaching the Caucasus, Romanus immediately renewed the offensive by marching into Albania with a small army. Bahram feigned a withdrawal of his army towards Ganzak, in an effort to draw the Byzantine army deeper into Sasanian territory so that he could cut them off, but Romanus understood the Persians' intention and restrained his men from pursuing. He sent 50 scouts to shadow the Sasanians, but Bahram's forces lured these into an ambush and captured most of them, though three of them escaped and informed Romanus. Via torture, the Persians learned from the captive scouts that Romanus' army was far smaller than their own and rapidly turned back to march against them. However, after the minor defeat of their scouting party, the Byzantines withdrew from Albania before Bahram could catch them, reaching the relative safety of Lazica.

== Battle of the Araxes ==
The Byzantines did not remain passive for long, as Romanus drew hand-picked reinforcements from the Byzantine forces stationed in Lazica, strengthening his army to 10,000 men. After drilling his men for a time, he renewed the offensive. Soon after crossing into Albania, the 2,000-horsemen strong Byzantine vanguard encountered the vanguard of Bahram Chobin's army near the Araxes and defeated it in a battle. The Byzantine vanguard pursued and killed most of the retreating enemy force, as a precipice blocked the retreat of the Persian horsemen, before reaching the encampment of the main army. After the engagement, the victorious Byzantine vanguard withdrew to re-join the main force under Romanus.

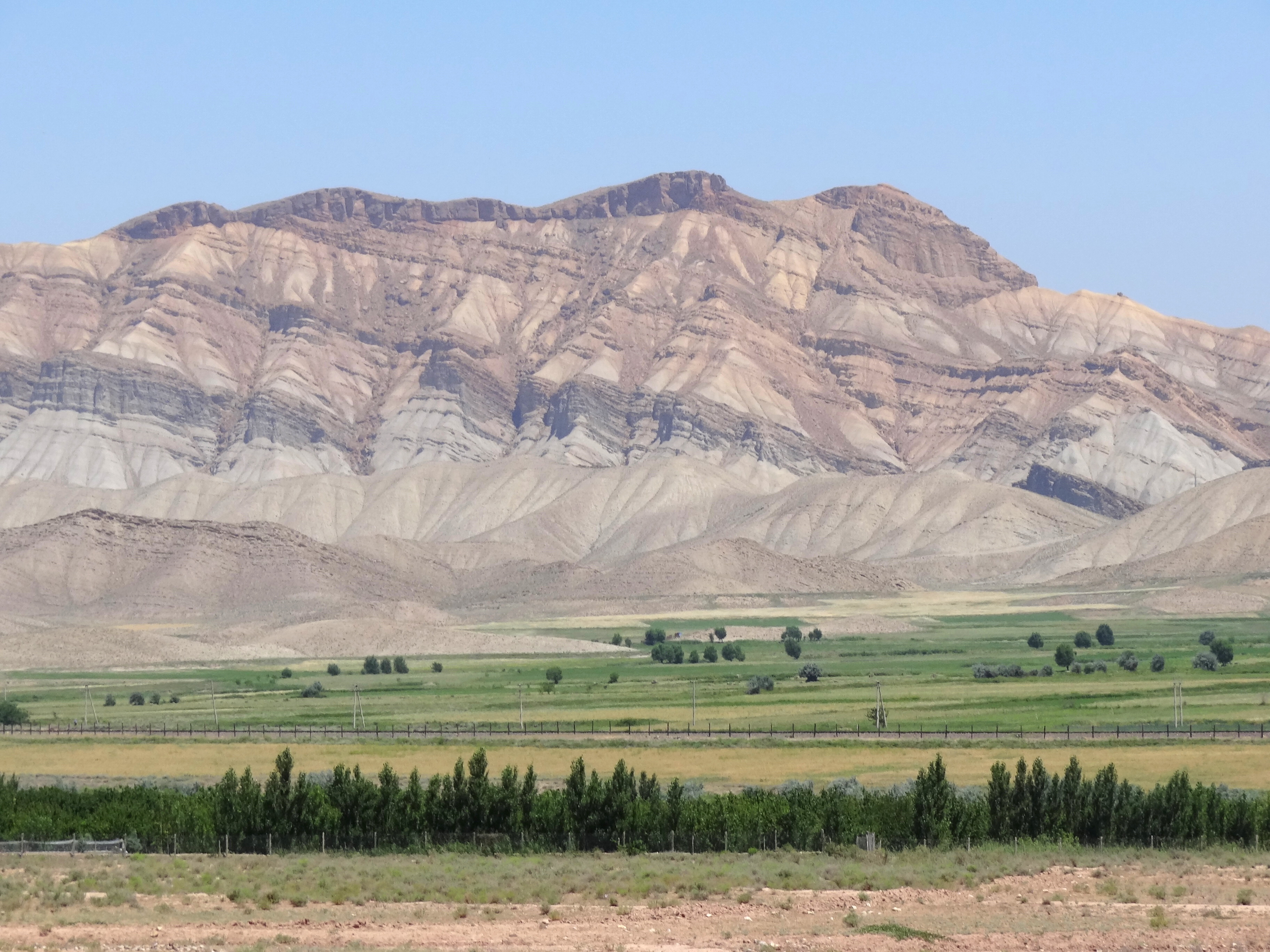
Modern view of the open terrain below the mountains in modern Nakhchivan, near the Aras river. Such terrain would have suited the heavy cavalry employed by the Sasanian and Byzantine armies

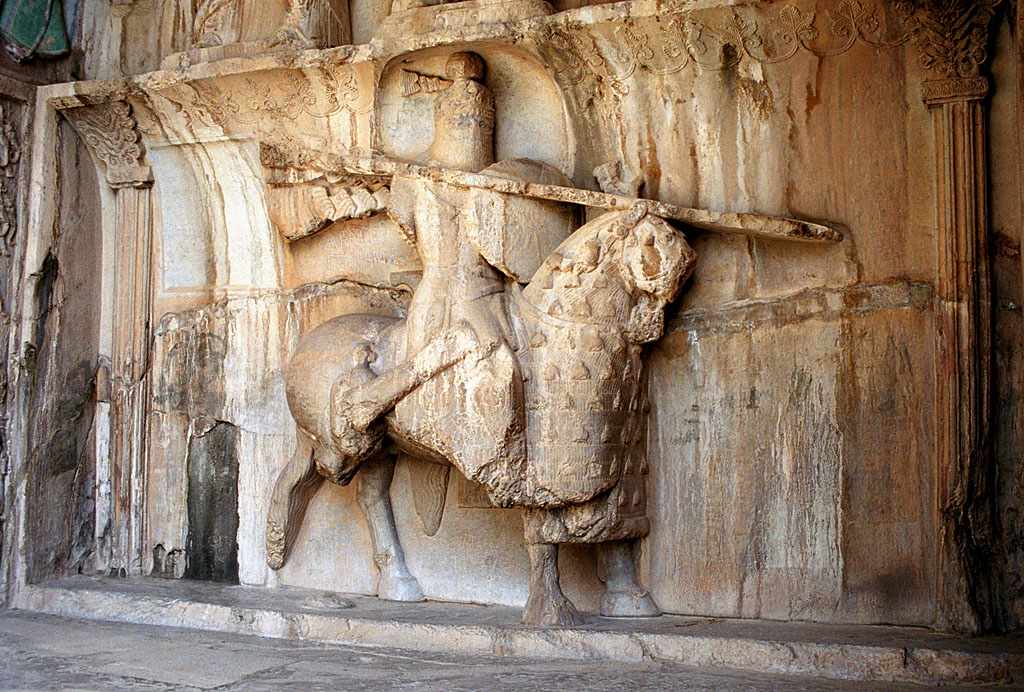
Sculpture of a Sasanian cataphract in Taq-e Bostan, 4th century

Romanus initially hesitated to engage the Sasanian force, as Bahram Chobin was a renowned commander and possessed a significant numerical advantage over the Byzantines. However, the confidence of his men led him to prepare them for combat. After two days, Bahram requested that the Byzantines allow his army to cross the river, which the latter allowed. After Bahram and his army had crossed, he attempted to steal victory via stratagem, but Romanus once again saw through the ruse and avoided disaster.

On the fifth day the opposing sides finally fought a pitched battle. Both armies were arrayed in three divisions. The Byzantine centre directed their attack against the centre of Bahram's line, with their lancers gaining the upper hand. Bahram Chobin transferred cavalry from his left flank to reinforce the centre and stabilize the line, but Romanus exploited this by dispatching reserve horsemen from the Byzantine right to attack the now depleted Persian left. The Sasanian left collapsed, and a complete rout of Bahram's army followed. The Byzantines conducted a vigorous pursuit and cut down thousands of Persians, whose bodies were subsequently stripped of equipment and left unburied to be consumed by wild animals.

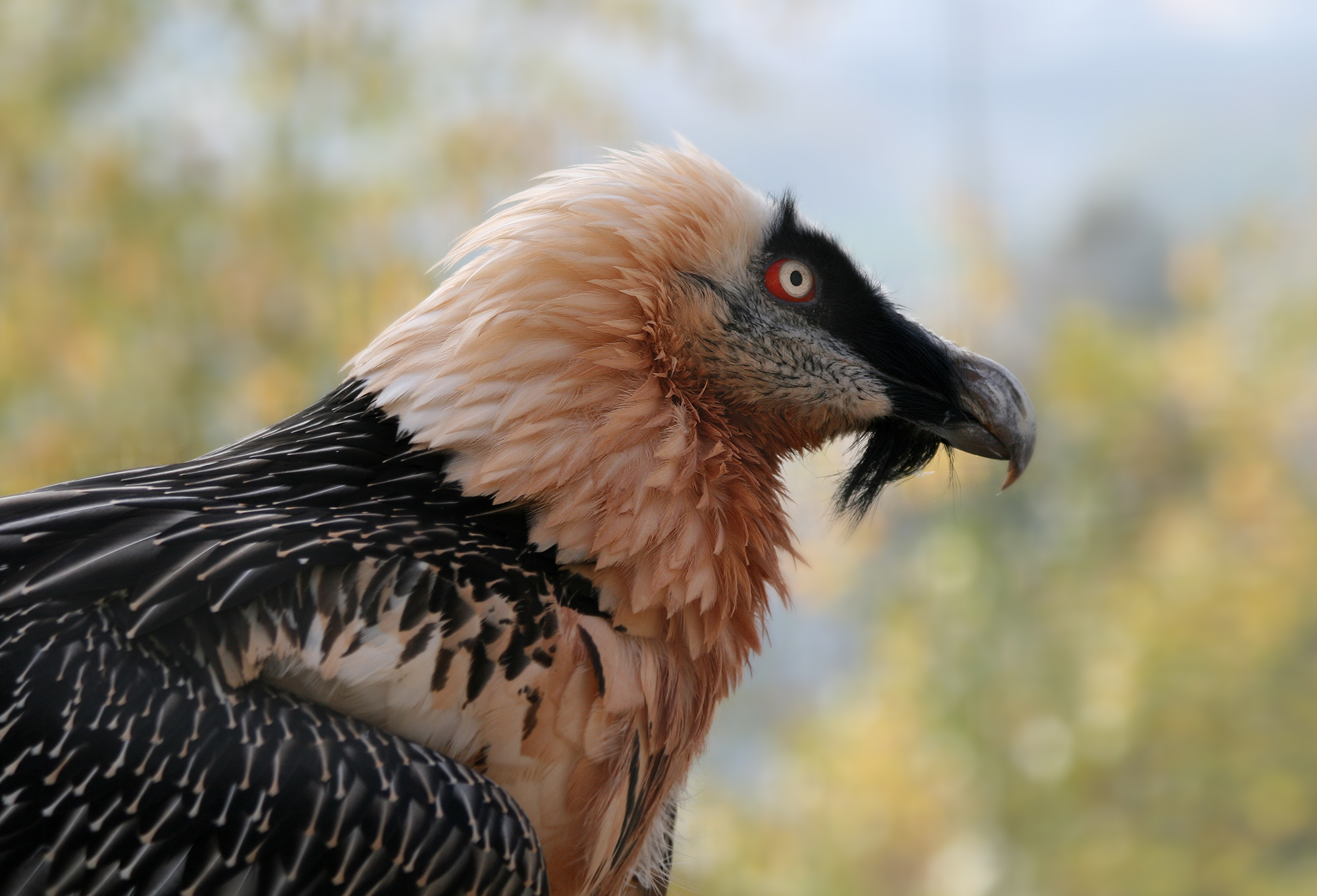
Photograph of a Bearded vulture which inhabit the Caucasus. Theophylact Simocatta recorded that scavengers such as these birds of prey feasted on the fallen soldiers and horses of the Persian army scattered across the plains near the Araxes

As noted by historian Michael Whitby, although he had been highly successful in conducting warfare in Central Asia against the Turks, Bahram had less experience facing the Byzantines and had underestimated the danger posed by their tactics, such as those outlined in the Strategikon. These methods dealt Bahram his first battlefield defeat. However, while the Sasanians had suffered heavy losses, the Byzantine victory was not in itself decisive, as a significant number of Persian cavalry had escaped the battlefield, alongside Bahram Chobin himself.

== Aftermath ==
Once news of this defeat reached Ctesiphon, the Shahenshah exploited the humbling of his general's prestige and publicly humiliated Bahram Chobin. According to Theophylact Simocatta, Hormizd dispatched female attire to Bahram as a gesture of humiliation for his defeat, and also made a royal decree dismissing him from his command as Spahbod. Incensed by these derisions of his name, Bahram defied Hormizd and mocked him in return. These tensions escalated into a full-scale revolt by Bahram Chobin against the Sasanian dynasty, leading to civil war in Persia. Later in 589, the Byzantines won another major victory against the Sasanian armies in Mesopotamia at the Battle of Sisauranon (589), which contributed further to instability in Persia as the survivors from this battle mutinied and joined Bahram's insurrection. Ultimately, Hormizd was deposed and his son Khosrow fled to the Byzantines seeking their support.

== Bibliography ==
- Whitby, Michael; Whitby, Mary (1986). The History of Theophylact Simocatta: An English Translation with Introduction. Oxford University Press.
- Whitby, Michael (1988). The Emperor Maurice and his Historian Theophylact Simocatta on Persian and Balkan Warfare. Clarendon Press. ISBN 978-0198229452.
- Syvänne, Ilkka (2022). The Military History of Late Rome AD 565-602. Pen and Sword. ISBN 978-1-5267-9395-9.
- Greatrex, Geoffrey; Lieu, Samuel N. C. (2002), The Roman Eastern Frontier and the Persian Wars (Part II, 363–630 AD), Routledge, ISBN 978-0-415-00342-1
- Goldsworthy, Adrian (2023). Rome and Persia: The Seven Hundred Year Rivalry. Basic Books. ISBN 978-1541619968.
