= Battle of Blarathon =

Battle during the Byzantine-Persian War of 572-591

Battle of the Blarathon
- Part of The Sasanian civil war of 589–591 and the Byzantine–Sassanid War of 572–591
- Map of the Byzantine-Persian frontier
Date	August 591
Location	Along the river Blarathon near Ganzak, northwest Persia 37.011555°N 46.193187°E
Result	Byzantine–Khosrow II victory

Belligerents
Byzantine Empire; Khosrow II's forces	Sasanian Empire; Usurper forces of Bahram Chobin

Commanders and leaders
John Mystacon; Narses; Khosrow II; Musel II Mamikonian; Bendōy; Bestām	Bahram Chobin

Strength
60,000 in total; 40,000 Byzantine troops; 12,000 Armenian cavalry; 8,000 Persian troops	Heavily outnumbered

Casualties and losses
Unknown	Unknown

The Battle of the Blarathon, also known as the Battle of Ganzak, was fought in 591 near Ganzak between a combined Byzantine–Persian force and a Persian army led by the usurper Bahram Chobin.

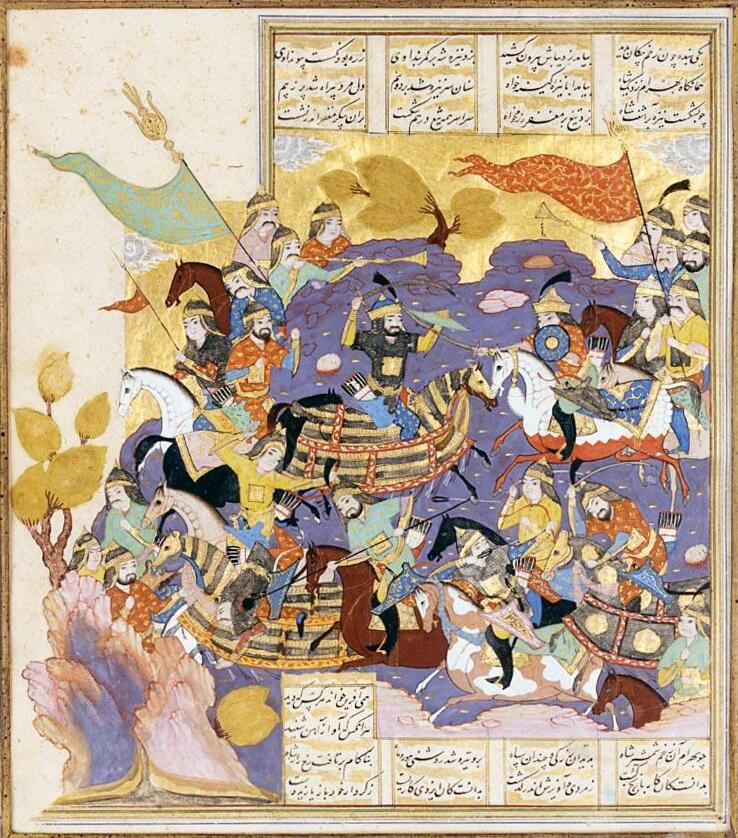
A Shahnameh illustration depicting the battle between Khosrow II and Bahram Chobin

== Background ==
In 590, Sasanian Shah Hormizd IV grew envious of the growing fame of his military commander, Bahram Chobin. After Bahram suffered a relatively minor defeat in a battle with the Byzantines on the banks of the Aras, Hormizd dismissed the general from his position and humiliated him by sending him a chain and a spindle to show that he considered him as a low slave "as ungrateful as a woman"

During the summer of 590 with the support of his devoted troops and other veterans, Bahram marched upon the Sasanian capital in rebellion against the ungrateful Shah. Before Bahram arrived in Ctesiphon, however, Hormizd was slain in a power struggle and his son Khosrow was placed on the throne. Upon the arrival of Bahram and his army, Khosrow fled to Byzantine territory. Bahram immediately took the throne and proclaimed himself king.

Khosrow and his two uncles, Bendōy and Bestām sought refuge at the Byzantine court, where the Byzantine Emperor, Maurice, made the decision to take advantage of the turmoil in Persia and assist Khosrow in regaining the throne. As a result and in exchange for territorial concessions, Maurice provided Khosrow with an army of 40,000 warriors commanded by Byzantine generals John Mystacon and Narses.

== Battle ==
During the summer of 591, Khosrow and the Byzantine army marched to Azerbaijan where they were to be joined by an army of 12,000 Armenians under Musel II Mamikonian and 8,000 Persians led by Bendōy and Bestām.

Hoping to confront the Byzantine army before it could consolidate forces in Azerbaijan, Bahram set out from Ctesiphon with a small army. Bahram arrived too late, however, and was faced by the combined forces of Khosrow's Byzantine army and his allies.

The two opposing armies fought over the course of three days in a plain along the Blarathon River near Ganzak in north-western Persia. In the evening of the third day, Bendōy convinced many of Bahram's army to desert by offering pardons and safety. In the end, Bahram's army was defeated and his camp overrun and captured. Bahram and 4,000 of his men escaped east to Nīšāpūr where he was received by the Ḵāqān of the Turks.

== Aftermath ==
Khosrow was swiftly reinstated upon the Persian throne, and as agreed upon returned Dara and Martyropolis to the Byzantines. Additionally, Khosrow agreed to a new partition of the Caucasus in which the Sassanians ceded many cities, including Armavir (Armaouira), Manzikert, Baguana, Valarsakert, Bagaran, Vardkesavan, Ani, Kars, and Zarisat to the Byzantines.

Most of the Kingdom of Iberia, including the cities of Ardahan, Lori, Dmanisi, Lomsia, Mtskheta, and Tontio became Byzantine dependencies. In addition, the city of Cytaea was given to Lazica, also a Byzantine dependency. As such, the Battle of the Blarathon altered the course of Byzantine-Sassanian relations dramatically, leaving the former in the dominant position. The extent of effective Byzantine control in the Caucasus reached its zenith historically, until the reign of Basil II.
