= Mushegh II Mamikonian =

- Մուշեղ Բ Մամիկոնյան

Marzban of Persian Armenia
- In office 591–591
- Monarch: Khosrau II
- Preceded by: Hrartin
- Succeeded by: Vindatakan

Personal details
- Born: Unknown
- Died: 593

Military service
- Battles/wars: Byzantine–Sasanian War of 572–591: Battle of Blarathon

Mushegh II Mamikonian (Armenian: Մուշեղ Բ Մամիկոնյան) was an Armenian nobleman from the Mamikonian family. During his later life he was nominated as Marzban of Persian Armenia, ruling briefly in 591.

== Biography ==
In 590, the Sasanian spahbed Bahram Chobin rebelled against the Sasanian king Hormizd IV. The latter was, however, deposed and killed by the Sasanian nobles before Bahram could confront him. One of the leaders behind the plot against Hormizd was Vistahm and Vinduyih, who made the king's son, Khosrau II, the new king of the Sasanian Empire.

However, shortly after the coronation of the new king, Bahram Chobin marched to Ctesiphon and proclaimed himself king under the name of Bahram VI. Khosrau along with Vistahm, and Vinduyih fled to Byzantine territory, where promised emperor Maurice I to cede territory in exchange for military aid. One later year, Khosrau, along with Mushegh II and other nobles, marched towards Ctesiphon, and defeated Bahram, who then fled to Azerbaijan, and wrote a letter to Mushegh, urging him to betray Khosrau. Mushegh, however, rejected the offer.

At the head of an army, Mushegh joined the Byzantine army and defeated the army of Bahram Chobin in Battle of Blarathon near Ganzak. Bahram then fled to Central Asia and was killed shortly after. Mushegh later resigned from the Marzban office, and retired, dying in 593.

Preceded by Hrartin	Marzban of Persian Armenia; 591	Succeeded by Vindatakan
