= Bawi (disambiguation) =

Bawi may refer to:

- Bawi, a Sasanian military officer from the Ispahbudhan family
- Bawi system, a system of slavery historically practiced by Lushai tribes
