= Azen Gushnasp =

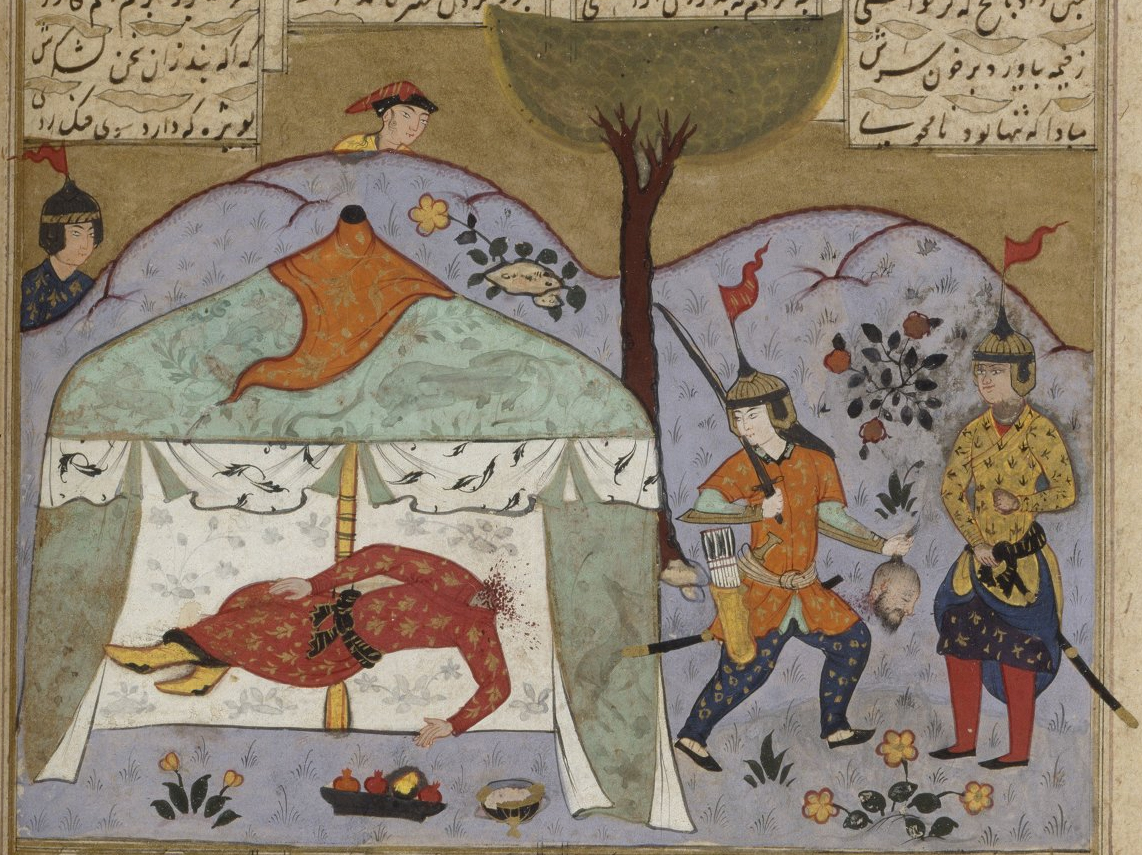
An illustration of Zadespras walking away from Azen Gushnasp's tent carrying his severed head.

Azen Gushnasp was an Iranian statesman who served as the minister (wuzurg framadār) of the Sasanian king Hormizd IV (r. 579–590) from an unknown date till his death in 590.

== Name ==
Although his name was "Āzēn Gushnasp", there are several corrupted versions of his name in several sources; Azhin Jushnas (al-Tabari and Ya'qubi); Azhin Koshasb (al-Tha'alibi); Ayin Goshasb (Shahnameh); Arikhsis (al-Mas'udi); Arhasis (Gardezi); Yazdan Jushnas (Dinavari); and Yazdan Bakhsh (Bal'ami).

== Biography ==
Azen Gushnasp was a native of Khuzestan, and is also called "Khuzi" by al-Mas'udi and Gardezi. He belonged to the arteshtaran class. It seems that when the Sasanian military commander Bahram Chobin won a great victory over the Turks, Azen Gushnasp reportedly became jealous and accused the general of having kept the best part of the booty for himself and only sending a small part to Hormizd IV. According to other sources, however, it was the captive Turkic prince Birmudha or the courtiers that raised Hormizd's suspicion. Regardless, Bahram Chobin was later dismissed by Hormizd, which resulted in the former starting a major rebellion. Azen Gushnasp was sent to suppress the rebellion, but was murdered in Hamadan by one of his own men, Zadespras.

== Sources ==
- Tafazzoli, A. (1988). "ĀZĪN JOŠNAS". Encyclopaedia Iranica, Vol. III, Fasc. 3. p. 260.
