= Kadagistan =

Short-lived province of the Sasanian Empire

- Province of Sasanian Empire
- 557–c. 591
- Capital: Warlu
- Historical era: Antiquity
  - Established by Khosrow I: 557
  - Turkic conquest: c. 591
Preceded by	Succeeded by
Hephthalite Empire	Western Turkic Khaganate
- Today part of: Afghanistan

Kadagistan (Middle Persian: Kadagistān) was the name of an eastern Sasanian province in the region of Tokharistan (in what is now north-eastern Afghanistan), established by Khosrow I (r. 531–579) after his victory over the Hephthalite Empire in 557. The capital of the province was Warlu, a city located in the valley of the Kunduz River.

In 587, the province was briefly seized by the Turkic Khagan Bagha Qaghan (known as Sabeh in Persian sources), who penetrated as far as Herat, thus violating the 557 consensus between Khosrow I and the Khagan Istämi which set the Oxus as the frontier between the two empires. The lands were reconquered by the Sasanian military leader Bahram Chobin in 589. The province was, however, most likely permanently seized by the Turks a few years later, due to the absence of Sasanian coins from the period.

== Sources ==
- Sims-Williams, Nicholas (2009). "Kadagistān". Encyclopaedia Iranica, Vol. XV, Fasc. 3. London et al. pp. 324–325.
- Rezakhani, Khodadad (2017). ReOrienting the Sasanians: East Iran in Late Antiquity. Edinburgh University Press. pp. 1–256. ISBN 9781474400305.
- Frye, Richard Nelson (1984). The History of Ancient Iran. C.H.Beck. pp. 1–411. ISBN 9783406093975. "The history of ancient iran."
- Shahbazi, A. Sh. (1988). "Bahrām VI Čōbīn". Encyclopaedia Iranica, Vol. III, Fasc. 5. London et al. pp. 514–522.
