= Sarames the Elder =

Iranian officer

Sarames the Elder was an Iranian officer of Median origin, who served in high offices under the Sasanian king Hormizd IV (r. 579–590), possibly as the governor of a province. When Bahram Chobin rebelled against Hormizd IV, Sarames was sent to suppress his rebellion, but was defeated and captured by the latter, who had him trampled to death by elephants.

== Sources ==
- Greatrex, Geoffrey; Lieu, Samuel N. C. (2002). The Roman Eastern Frontier and the Persian Wars (Part II, 363–630 AD). London, United Kingdom: Routledge. ISBN 0-415-14687-9.
- Warren, Soward (24 September 2023). Theophylact Simocatta and the Persians (PDF). Sasanika. Archived from the original (PDF) on 26 February 2015.
