= Turco-Persian wars =

The term Turco-Persian wars can refer to two sets of conflicts between Turkic states and Persian states:

The Göktürk–Persian wars, between the Göktürks and the Sasanian Empire:

- Perso-Turkic war of 588–589
- Perso-Turkic war of 627–629

The Ottoman–Persian Wars, between the Ottoman Empire and a succession of Persian dynasties:

- Ottoman–Safavid War (1505–1517)
- Ottoman–Safavid War (1532–1555)
- Ottoman–Safavid War (1578–1590)
- Ottoman–Safavid War (1603–1612)
- Ottoman–Safavid War (1616–1618)
- Ottoman–Safavid War (1623–1639)
- Ottoman–Persian War (1730–1735)
- Ottoman–Persian War (1743–1746)
- Ottoman–Persian War (1775–1776)
- Ottoman–Persian War (1821–1823)
