= Bawi =

- Died: 531; Ctesiphon
- Military career
- Allegiance: Sasanian Empire
- Branch: Sasanian army
- Rank: Spahbed
- Conflicts: Iberian War; Anastasian War

Bawi was a Sasanian military officer from the Ispahbudhan family who was involved in the Anastasian War and the Iberian War between the Sasanian and Byzantine Empire. He is also known as Aspebedes, which is a corruption of the title spahbed.

== Biography ==
Map of the Byzantine-Persian frontier

According to Procopius, coins of Bawi were minted during the reign of Kavadh I (r. 488-496, 499-531) due to the marriage of the latter with his sister, and, therefore, he became the uncle of the future king Khosrau I (r. 531-579). Apparently he was the father of a person known as Asparapet, whose original name was Shapur, who was the grandfather of Shah Khosrau II (r. 591-628), the son of Shapur's daughter and Hormizd IV (r. 579-590); beyond this relationship, it is known that Shapur was the father of Vistahm and Vinduyih.

According to some sources, Bawi participated in the negotiations that led to the peace of 506 between Anastasius I (r. 491-518) and Kavadh I, which ended the Anastasian War. After the Sasanian defeat at the battle of Dara during the Iberian War, Kavadh organized an invasion of Byzantine territory, in which a large army, commanded by Mihr-Mihroe, Chanaranges and Bawi, who invaded Mesopotamia and besieged the city of Martyropolis, which at that time was being protected by Buzes and Bessas. While commanding a large force, with winter approaching and Byzantine reinforcements coming from Amida and the sudden death of Kavadh, the Sasanians lifted the siege in November or December.

At the beginning of Khosrau I's reign in 531, Bawi, along with other members of the Persian aristocracy became involved in a conspiracy in which they tried to overthrow Khosrau and make Kavadh, the son of Kavadh's second eldest son Djamasp (Zames), the king of the Sasanian Empire. Upon learning of the plot, Khosrau executed all his brothers, their offspring, along with Bawi and the other "Persian notables" who were involved. Khosrau also ordered the execution of Kavadh, who was still a child, and was away from the court, being raised by Adergoudounbades. Khosrau sent orders to kill Kavadh, but Adergoudounbades disobeyed and brought him up in secret, until he was betrayed to the shah in 541 by his own son, Bahram (Varranes). Khosrau had him executed, but Kavadh, or someone claiming to be him, managed to flee to the Byzantine Empire.

== Family tree ==
Bawi
Shapur
Vinduyih	Vistahm
Farrukh Hormizd	Tiruyih	Vinduyih
Rostam Farrokhzād	Farrukhzad
Shahram	Surkhab I	Isfandyadh	Bahram	Farrukhan

== Bibliography ==
- Frye, R. N. (1983). "The political history of Iran under the Sasanians". In Yarshater, Ehsan (ed.). The Cambridge History of Iran: The Seleucid, Parthian and Sasanian Periods. Vol. 3(1). Cambridge: Cambridge University Press. ISBN 0-521-20092-X.
- Greatrex, Geoffrey; Lieu, Samuel N. C. (2002). The Roman Eastern Frontier and the Persian Wars (Part II, 363–630 AD). London: Routledge. ISBN 0-415-14687-9.
- Martindale, John R., ed. (1992). The Prosopography of the Later Roman Empire: Volume III, AD 527–641. Cambridge: Cambridge University Press. ISBN 0-521-20160-8.
- Pourshariati, Parvaneh (2008). Decline and fall of the Sasanian Empire. New York: IB Tauris & Co Ltd. ISBN 978-1-84511-645-3.
- Procopius (2007). History of the Wars: Books 1-2 (Persian War). Cosimo, Inc. ISBN 978-1602064454.
