= Izadgushasp =

Iranian nobleman in the Sasanian Empire

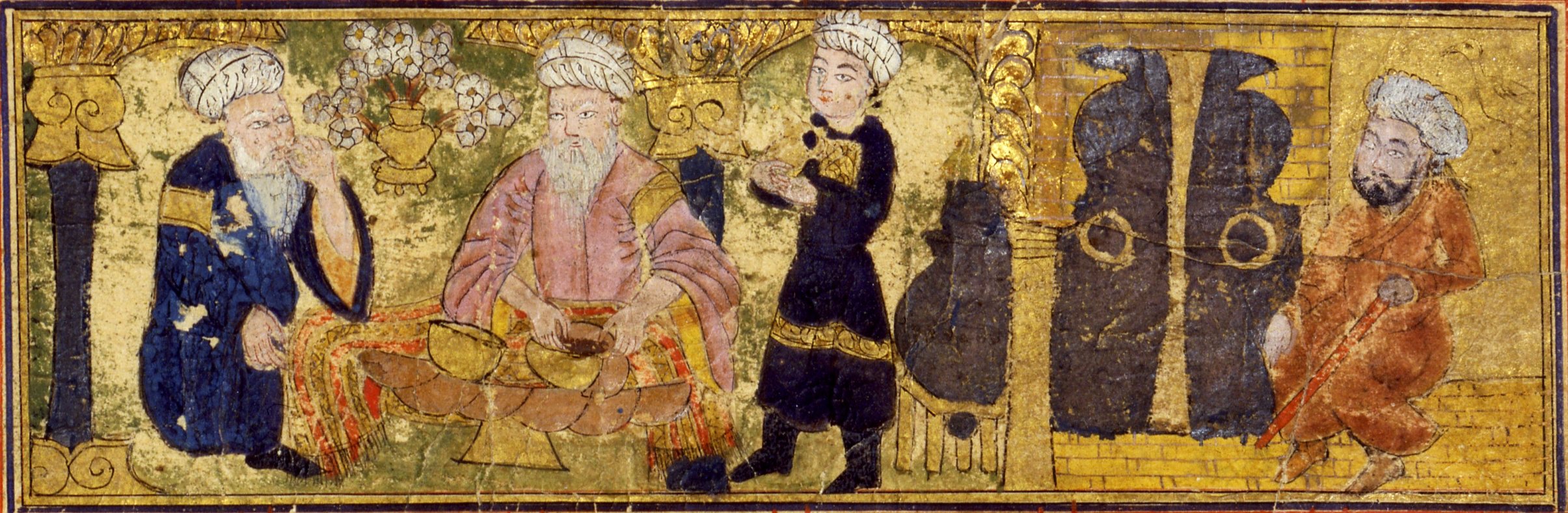
- 14th-century miniature of the chief priest (mowbed) bringing food to the captive Izadgushasp, shortly before he is executed.
- Born: Iran
- Died: 580s Ctesiphon
- Military career
- Allegiance: Sasanian Empire
- Branch: Sasanian army
- Rank: Wuzurg framadar
- Conflicts: Lazic War; Siege of Dara

Izadgushasp (also spelled Yazdgushnasp), known in Byzantine sources as Isdigousnas Zikh, was an Iranian nobleman from the House of Mihran, who served as one of Khosrow I's viziers (wuzurg framadar).

== Biography ==
Izadgushasp is first mentioned during the reign of Khosrow I, as one of the highest dignitaries and most powerful noblemen, being both Khosrow's vizier and chamberlain. He had a brother named Fariburz (also known as Phabrizus) who also held high offices. Procopius describes them as: "both holding most important offices ... and at the same time reckoned to be the basest of all Persians, having a great reputation for their cleverness and evil ways." Izadgushasp, along with two other powerful magnates named Chihr-Burzen and Bahram-i Mah Adhar, were even asked by Khosrow to choose his heir.

During the Lazic War, Izadgushasp and Fariburz played an important role in the capture of Lazica. During the peace negotiations to end the war, Izadgushasp was the spokesman of the Sasanians, and made a treaty with the Byzantines in which they paid a great tribute of gold.

In 547, Khosrow I, who was keen to wrest Dara from Byzantine control, tried to trick them in order to capture it; he sent Izadgushasp as a diplomat to Constantinople, but in reality the latter would stop by Dara, and with the aid of his large crew, he would seize the city. However, this plan was prevented by a former of adviser of Belisarius named George, who demanded that if Izadgushasp should enter the city he should have only twenty members of his crew with him. Izadgushasp then left the city and continued his journey to Constantinople, where he received a friendly welcome from Justinian, who gave him some gifts.

In 573, during the Byzantine–Sasanian War of 572–591, Khosrow sent an army under Adarmahan to invade Syria, while he himself, along with Izadgushasp and Fariburz, led an army towards Dara, capturing the city after four months. Adarmahan sacked several cities in Syria, which included Apamea. The Byzantine emperor Justin II reportedly lost his mind after these Byzantine disasters and abdicated. In 579, Khosrow was succeeded by his son Hormizd IV, who later ordered the death of 13,600 nobles and religious members, including Izadgushasp, who was first imprisoned and then executed.

== Sources ==
- Pourshariati, Parvaneh (2008). Decline and Fall of the Sasanian Empire: The Sasanian-Parthian Confederacy and the Arab Conquest of Iran. London, United Kingdom: I.B. Tauris. ISBN 978-1-84511-645-3.
- Greatrex, Geoffrey; Lieu, Samuel N. C. (2002). The Roman Eastern Frontier and the Persian Wars (Part II, 363–630 AD). New York, New York and London, United Kingdom: Routledge (Taylor & Francis). ISBN 0-415-14687-9.
- Martindale, John Robert; Jones, Arnold Hugh Martin; Morris, J., eds. (1992). The Prosopography of the Later Roman Empire, Volume III: A.D. 527–641. Cambridge, United Kingdom: Cambridge University Press. ISBN 978-0-521-20160-5.
- Morony, Michael G. (2005) [1984]. Iraq After The Muslim Conquest. Gorgias Press LLC. ISBN 978-1-59333-315-7. Archived from the original on 2016-05-05.
