= Bahram Siyavashan =

Iranian commander

Bahram Siyavashan (Middle Persian: Wahrām Siyāvakhšan) was an Iranian commander, who supported the prominent Sasanian military leader Bahram Chobin. He played an active role in the early stages of the Sasanian civil war of 589-591, but was killed by Bahram Chobin in 590 after attempting to assassinate him.

== Sources ==
- Khaleghi-Motlagh, Dj. (1988). "Bahrām Sīāvošān". Encyclopaedia Iranica, Vol. III, Fasc. 5. p. 525.
