= Bahram-i Mah Adhar =

6th-century Iranian official and military commander

- Born: Wahrān
- Died: c. 580–585
- Other name: Khusraw
- Military career
- Allegiance: Sasanian Empire
- Rank: Spahbed of the South, hazāruft of the empire

Bahrām-i Māh Ādhar was a 6th-century Iranian aristocrat who held high military and civil offices under Khosrow I (r. 531–579) and Hormizd IV (r. 579–590).

== Biography ==
Bahram-i Mah Adhar is the name given to this figure by the 10th-century Persian poet Ferdowsi, whose epic Shahnameh is one of the main sources on Sasanian history. Modern scholarship identifies him with Wahrām Ādurmāh ("Wahram, son of Adurmah"), based on two seal impressions of his discovered by Rika Gyselen (The Four Generals of the Sasanian Empire: Some Sigillographic Evidence. Istituto Italiano per l'Africa e l'Oriente, 2001). One of the seals dates to the reign of Khosrow I, and one to the reign of Hormizd IV. His exact familial lineage is unknown, but based on a seal referring to him as "Bahrām, son of Āturmāh, descended from gods", Ferdinand Justi suggested (Iranisches Namenbuch, Marburg, 1895) a close relationship to the Sasanian dynasty itself.

According to the seals, under both Khosrow and Hormizd, Bahram was the military governor-general (spahbed) of the southern region of the Sasanian Empire (kūst-i nēmrōz). He is also identified as a eunuch and "chief of" a region or office whose name is missing. The later seal also records his holding the office of "hazāruft of the empire", indicating that he was promoted under Hormizd. According to the Shahnameh, Bahram was one of the leading officials of Khosrow's court; along with two other powerful magnates, Simah-i Burzin and Izadgushasp, he was consulted by Khosrow on choosing his heir. Hormizd eventually turned against these magnates, and tried to diminish their influence by removing them altogether. According to the Shahnameh, he instigated Bahram to turn against Simah-i Burzin (the spahbed of the east), before having both executed, along with Izadgushasp. During his imprisonment, he allegedly predicted the invasions by the empire's enemies, and the eventual overthrow and murder of Hormizd. His death is put around 580–585 CE.

== Sources ==
- Pourshariati, Parvaneh (2008). Decline and Fall of the Sasanian Empire: The Sasanian-Parthian Confederacy and the Arab Conquest of Iran. London, United Kingdom: I.B. Tauris. ISBN 978-1-84511-645-3.
