= Chihr-Burzen =

6th-century Iranian nobleman

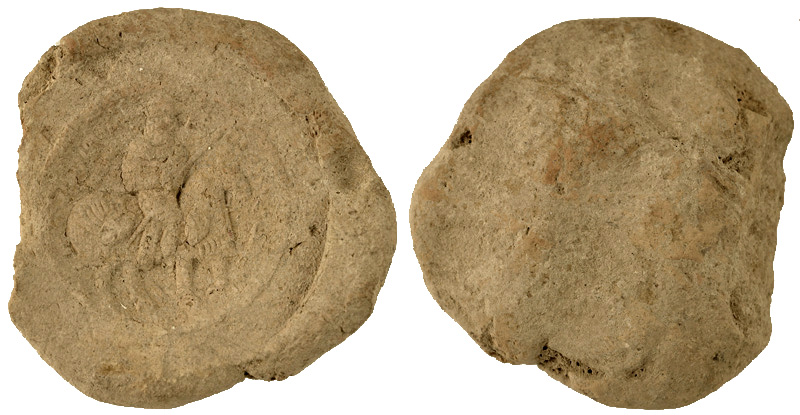
- Seal with an image of a horse and rider facing right, most likely Chihr-Burzen
- Born: Ērānshahr
- Died: 580–585; Ctesiphon
- Military career
- Allegiance: Sasanian Empire
- Branch: Sasanian army
- Rank: Spahbed

Chihr-Burzen, also known as Simah-i Burzin, was an Iranian nobleman from the House of Karen, who served as the Sasanian spahbed of Khorasan.

== Biography ==
Chihr-Burzen was the son of the powerful Sasanian noble Sukhra, and had eight other brothers, which included the prominent nobleman Bozorgmehr. Chihr-Burzen is first mentioned during the reign of Khosrau I, as one of the elites and most prominent men of the Empire. He, along with two other powerful magnates named Izadgushasp and Bahram-i Mah Adhar, were asked by Khosrau I to choose his successor. The family of Chihr-Burzen, including many other prominent aristocracy families, eventually elected Khosrau's son Hormizd as the heir of the Empire. In 579, Khosrau was succeeded by his son Hormizd IV, who removed Chihr-Burzen as the spahbed of Khorasan and replaced him with his brother Bozorgmehr. During the 580s, Hormizd ordered the death of 13,600 nobles and religious members, which included Chihr-Burzen.

== Sources ==
- Pourshariati, Parvaneh (2008). Decline and Fall of the Sasanian Empire: The Sasanian-Parthian Confederacy and the Arab Conquest of Iran. London, United Kingdom: I.B. Tauris. ISBN 978-1-84511-645-3.
