= Farrukhan (6th century) =

Farrukhan (known in Greek sources as Pherochanes) was a 6th-century Iranian general active during the reign of the Sasanian King of Kings (shahanshah) Hormizd IV (r. 579–590). In 590, he was sent to suppress the rebellion of Bahram Chobin, but was betrayed and killed by his own men.

== Sources ==
- Bonner, Michael (2020). The Last Empire of Iran. New York: Gorgias Press. pp. 1–406. ISBN 978-1463206161.
- Warren, Soward. Theophylact Simocatta and the Persians. Sasanika.
- Whitby, Michael (1988). The Emperor Maurice and his Historian – Theophylact Simocatta on Persian and Balkan Warfare. Oxford: Oxford University Press. ISBN 978-0-19-822945-2.
