= Hormizd IV =

Shahanshah of the Sasanian Empire from 579 to 590

Hormizd IV 𐭠𐭥𐭧𐭥𐭬𐭦𐭣
- King of Kings of Iranians and non-Iranians
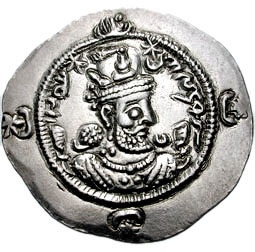
- Drachma of Hormizd IV, minted at Spahan

Shahanshah of the Sasanian Empire
- Reign: 579–590
- Predecessor: Khosrow I
- Successor: Bahram Chobin (rival king); Khosrow II (successor)
- Born: c. 540
- Died: June 590 (aged 50); Ctesiphon
- Spouse: Unnamed Ispahbudhan noblewoman Unnamed Christian noblewoman
- Issue: Khosrow II; Unnamed daughter
- House: House of Sasan
- Father: Khosrow I
- Mother: Khazar princess
- Religion: Zoroastrianism

Hormizd IV (also spelled Hormozd IV or Ohrmazd IV; Middle Persian: 𐭠𐭥𐭧𐭥𐭬𐭦𐭣) was the King of Kings of Sasanian Iran from 579 to 590. He was the son and successor of Khosrow I (r. 531–579) and his mother was a Khazar princess.

During his reign, Hormizd IV had the high aristocracy and Zoroastrian priesthood slaughtered while supporting the landed gentry (the dehqans). His reign was marked by constant warfare: to the west, he fought a long and indecisive war with the Byzantine Empire, which had been ongoing since the reign of his father; and to the east, the Iranian general Bahram Chobin successfully contained and defeated the Western Turkic Khaganate during the First Perso-Turkic War. It was also during Hormizd IV's reign that the Chosroid dynasty of Iberia was abolished. After negotiating with the Iberian aristocracy and winning their support, Hormizd successfully incorporated Iberia into the Sasanian Empire.

Jealous of Bahram's success in the east, Hormizd IV had him disgraced and dismissed, which led to a rebellion led by Bahram, which marked the start of the Sasanian civil war of 589–591. Another faction, led by two other dissatisfied nobles, Vistahm and Vinduyih, had Hormizd IV deposed and killed, and placed his son Khosrow II on the throne.

Hormizd IV was noted for his religious tolerance. He declined appeals by the Zoroastrian priesthood to persecute the Christian population of the country. Contemporary sources generally considered him to be a tyrannical figure due to his policies. Modern historians tend to have a milder view of him and considers him a well-meaning ruler who strived to continue his father's policies, albeit overambitiously.

== Etymology ==
Hormizd (also spelled Ōhrmazd and Hormozd) is the Middle Persian version of the name of the supreme deity in Zoroastrianism, known in Avestan as Ahura Mazda. The Old Persian equivalent is Auramazdā, while the Greek transliteration is Hormisdas. The name is attested in Armenian as Ormizd and in Georgian as Urmizd.

== Ancestry ==
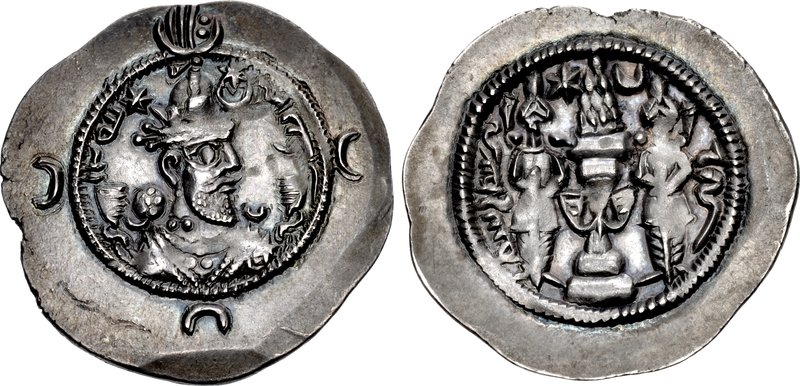
Drachma of Khosrow I Anushirvan (r. 531–579)

Hormizd was the son of Khosrow I, one of the most celebrated Sasanian shahs. Oriental sources and modern scholars have identified Hormizd's maternal grandfather as Istemi, the khagan of the Turks, who allied himself with Khosrow I in c. 560 to put an end to the Hephthalites, which the two allied powers accomplished at the Battle of Gol-Zarriun. Khosrow I was given the daughter of Istemi in marriage, who reportedly gave birth to Hormizd. Hormizd is thus called a Turkzad(a) in the Shahnameh, or 'son of a Turk'. This is, however, rejected by the Iranologist Shapur Shahbazi, who called such a relationship a "chronological difficulty", due to sources mentioning Hormizd being sent by his father to contain the threat posed by Istemi following the division of Hephthalite territory between the Sasanians and Turks.

Historians consider it more plausible that Hormizd was born around 540: his son Khosrow II was thus born in c. 570. The 7th-century Armenian historian Sebeos called Hormizd's mother a "daughter of the khagan of the Turks" (Note: In fact, Sebeos refers to the T‘etalats‘ik‘, literally 'Hephthalites', but James Howard-Johnston writes that the term is being used loosely to refer to the Turks. Michael Bonner believes that Sebeos actually meant the Hephthalites.) and referred to her as Kayen, whilst Mas'udi called her Faqum, stating that she was the daughter of the ruler of the Khazars. Shahbazi supported the German orientalist Josef Markwart in his deduction that Hormizd's maternal grandfather was the khagan of the Khazars (who are frequently called Turks in other sources), and that Sebeos had referred to Hormizd's mother by her father's name (or title). The medieval Iranian geographer Ibn Khordadbeh also mentioned Khosrow I and the Khazar king organizing to marry each other's daughters. Hormizd was thus not only an offspring of the highly esteemed Khosrow I of the ruling family of Iran, but also belonged to a royal Turkic dynasty, which according to Sebeos "made Hormizd even greater than his paternal ancestors and equally greater and wilder than his maternal relatives". The modern historian Michael Bonner proposes instead that Hormizd may have been born to a Hephthalite princess, later misremembered as Turkic or Khazar.

== Policies and personality ==
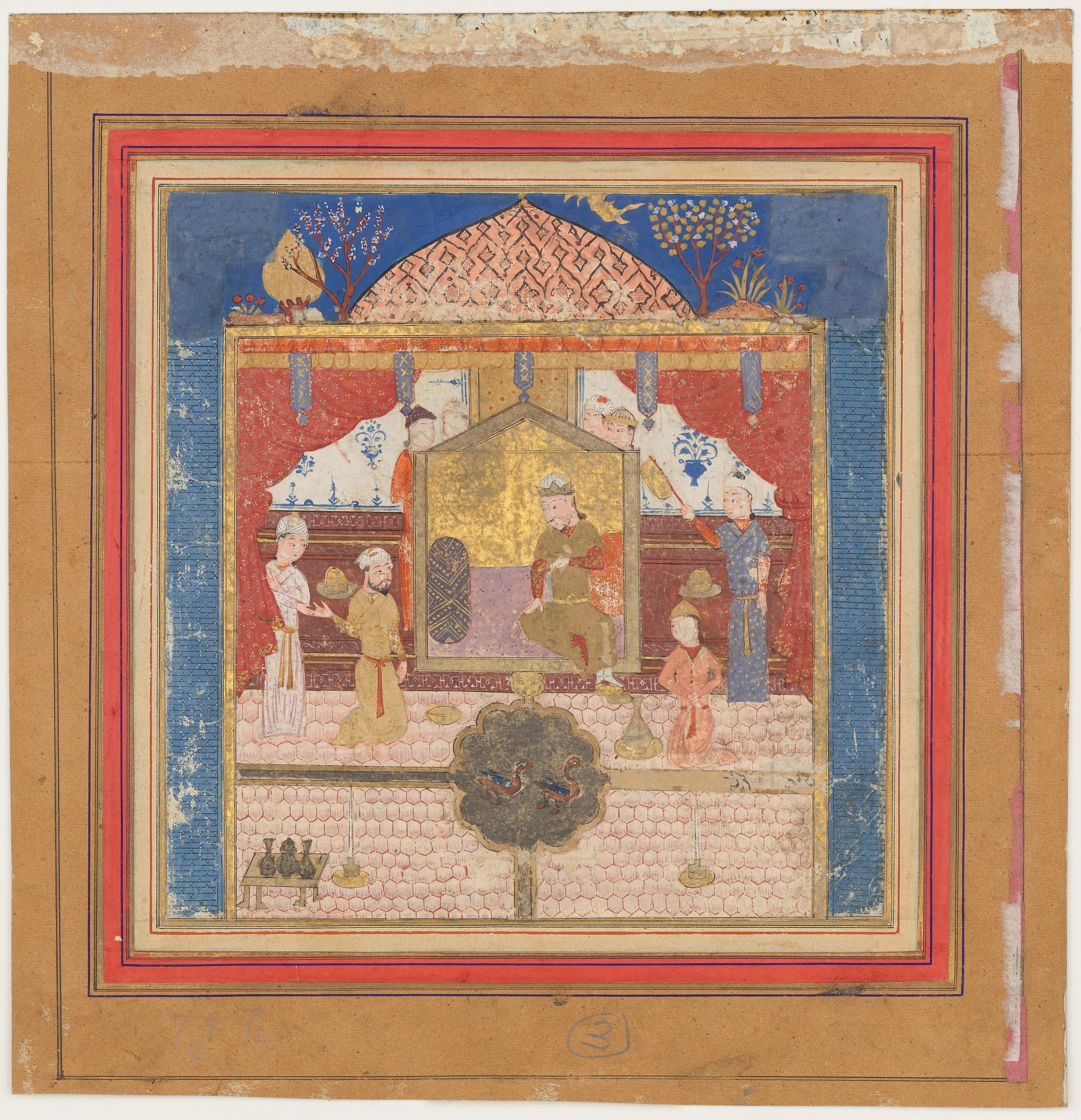
15th-century Shahnameh illustration of Hormizd IV seated on his throne

Khosrow I, aware that Hormizd had shown himself as a leader of quality, appointed Hormizd as his heir. The decision was also politically motivated, due to Hormizd's maternal line being of noble lineage, whilst the mothers of Khosrow I's other sons were more lowly. Hormizd came to the throne in 579: according to the narratives included in the history of al-Tabari, Hormizd was well learned and full of good aspirations of kindness toward the poor and weak. He was seemingly less warlike than his predecessors, but was resolute enough to continue their reforms. He appears to have striven his best to continue the policies of his father—supporting the landed gentry (the dehqan) against the aristocracy and protecting the rights of the lower classes, as well as thwarting efforts by the Zoroastrian priesthood to reassert themselves. He did, however, resort to executions in order to maintain his father's policies, and as a result became the subject of hostility by the Zoroastrians. He declined an appeal by the priesthood to persecute the Christian population by asserting his wish that "all his subjects were to exercise their religion freely". He reportedly had many members of the priesthood killed, including the chief priest (mowbed) himself.

He strained his relationship with the aristocracy by having thousands of them killed. Many had been distinguished figures under Hormizd's father, such as the latter's famous minister (wuzurg framadar) Bozorgmehr; the military commander (spahbed) of Khwarasan, Chihr-Burzen; the spahbed of Nemroz, Bahram-i Mah Adhar; the distinguished dignitary Izadgushasp; the spahbed of the southwest (Khwarwaran), Shapur, an Ispahbudhan nobleman who was the father of Vistahm; Vinduyih; and an unnamed daughter whom Hormizd had married. Hormizd was himself related to the family, with his paternal grandmother being a sister of Bawi, the father of Shapur. Hormizd was not the first Sasanian shah to kill a close relative from the Ispahbudhan family: his father Khosrow I had ordered the execution of Bawi in the early 530s. Nevertheless, the Ispahbudhans continued to enjoy such a high status that they were acknowledged as "kin and partners of the Sasanians", with Vistahm being appointed as the successor of his father by Hormizd.

Due to his persecutions against the nobility and clergy, Hormizd thus became viewed with hostility in Persian sources. This was not unusual: the 5th-century Sasanian ruler Yazdegerd I is portrayed very negatively in Persian sources due to his tolerant policy towards his non-Zoroastrian subjects, and his refusal to comply with the demands of the aristocracy and priesthood, thus becoming known as the "sinner". Although met with hostility in medieval sources, Hormizd is portrayed in a more positive light in modern sources. The German orientalist Theodor Nöldeke deemed the negative portrayal of Hormizd as unreasonable, and considered the shah to be "a well-meaning sovereign who intended to restrain the nobility and clergy and ease the burden of the lower classes: his effort was on the whole justified, but the unhappy outcome shows that he was not the man to reach such lofty goals with peace and competence". Michael Bonner states that "the Persian royal tradition has covered Hurmazd in opprobrium, and the principal features of his reign have been deformed."

== War against the Byzantines ==
Map of the Byzantine-Sasanian frontier in Late Antiquity

From his father, Hormizd had inherited an ongoing war against the East Roman (Byzantine) Empire. Negotiations of peace had just begun with the Emperor Tiberius II, who offered to give up all claims to Armenia and interchange the Byzantine-occupied Arzanene for the Iranian-occupied Dara (which was an important Byzantine stronghold). Hormizd, however, further demanded the payment of the yearly tribute that was made during the reign of Justinian I (r. 527–565), and thus caused the negotiations to be broken off. No campaign in Mesopotamia was undertaken by either of the empires due to the negotiations, however they continued to clash in Armenia, where Varaz Vzur succeeded Tamkhosrow as the new Sasanian governor of Armenia.

The Byzantines were successful at their endeavors, securing a noteworthy victory under the commanders Cours and John Mystacon, albeit also suffering a defeat at the hands of the Sasanians. In early 580, the clients and vassals of the Sasanians, the Lakhmids, were defeated at the hands of the Ghassanids, vassals of the Byzantines. In the same year, a Byzantine army ravaged Garamig ud Nodardashiragan, reaching as far as Media. Around the same time, Bakur III, the Sasanian client king of Iberia, died, leaving behind two sons who were underage. Hormizd took advantage of the situation by abolishing the Iberian monarchy, i.e. the Chosroid dynasty. He appointed his son Khosrow as the governor of Caucasian Albania, who negotiated with the Iberian aristocracy and won their support, so successfully incorporating the country into the Sasanian Empire.

The following year (581), an ambitious campaign by the Byzantine commander Maurice, supported by Ghassanid forces under al-Mundhir III, targeted the Sasanian capital of Ctesiphon. The combined force moved south along the river Euphrates, accompanied by a fleet of ships. The army stormed the fortress of Anatha and moved on until it reached the region of Beth Aramaye in central Mesopotamia, near Ctesiphon. There they found the bridge over the Euphrates destroyed by the Iranians. In response to Maurice's advance, the Iranian general Adarmahan was ordered to operate in northern Mesopotamia, threatening the Byzantine army's supply line. Adarmahan raided Osrhoene, and was successful in capturing its capital, Edessa. He then marched his army toward Callinicum on the Euphrates. With the possibility of a march to Ctesiphon gone, Maurice was forced to retreat. The retreat was arduous for the tired army, and Maurice and al-Mundhir exchanged recriminations for the expedition's failure. However, they cooperated in forcing Adarmahan to withdraw and defeated him at Callinicum.

Tiberius tried afterwards to renew negotiations by sending Zachariah to the frontier to meet Andigan. The negotiations broke off once more after Andigan attempted to pressure him by drawing the attention of the nearby Iranian contingent led by Tamkhosrow. In 582, Tamkhosrow, along with Adarmahan, invaded Byzantine territory and headed for the town of Constantina. Maurice, who had been expecting and preparing for such an attack, fought the Iranians outside the city in June 582. The Iranian army suffered a heavy defeat, and Tamkhosrow was killed. Not long afterwards, the deteriorating physical condition of Tiberius forced Maurice to return immediately to Constantinople to assume the crown. Meanwhile, John Mystacon, who had replaced Maurice as the Commander of the East, attacked the Sasanians at the junction of the Nymphius and the Tigris, but was defeated by the Iranian general Kardarigan.

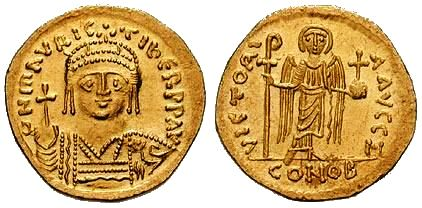
Solidus of the Byzantine emperor Maurice (r. 582–602)

In 583, the objective of the Iranian army was to recapture the fortress Aphumon, which had been seized by Maurice in 578. However, while they besieged the fortress, the Romans besieged Akbas, a newly constructed fortress east of the Nymphius and thus close to the Roman frontier. This diverted the attention of the Iranian soldiers at Aphumon, who went to relieve Akbas. By the end of year, however, the Romans had destroyed the fortress. Hormizd then sued for peace: in 584, an Iranian envoy arrived at Constantinople, while a Roman envoy arrived at Ctesiphon. The negotiations, however, broke off once again. Around the same time, Philippicus was appointed the new Commander of the East.

In 585, Kardarigan went on the offensive, besieging the Byzantine base of Monocarton. The siege failed, and he then marched north to Martyropolis, Philippicus's base; after sacking the church of John the Baptist near the city, however, he returned to Iranian territory, most likely Armenia. In the spring of 586, Hormizd once again attempted to make peace, and sent Mahbod to negotiate with Philippicus at Amida. Negotiations, however, broke down once more after the Iranians demanded gold in exchange for peace. Not long after, an Iranian force—led by Kardarigan, Aphraates and Mahbod—suffered a heavy defeat against the Byzantines at the Battle of Solachon. The victory was followed by destructive raids into Corduene and Arbayistan. In the following year, the new commander of the east, Heraclius the Elder, captured three fortresses near Dara. The Iranians took advantage of the discord in the Roman army between 588 and 589, and managed to successfully occupy Martyropolis in 589 with the help of a turncoat Roman officer.

== Turkic incursions in the east ==
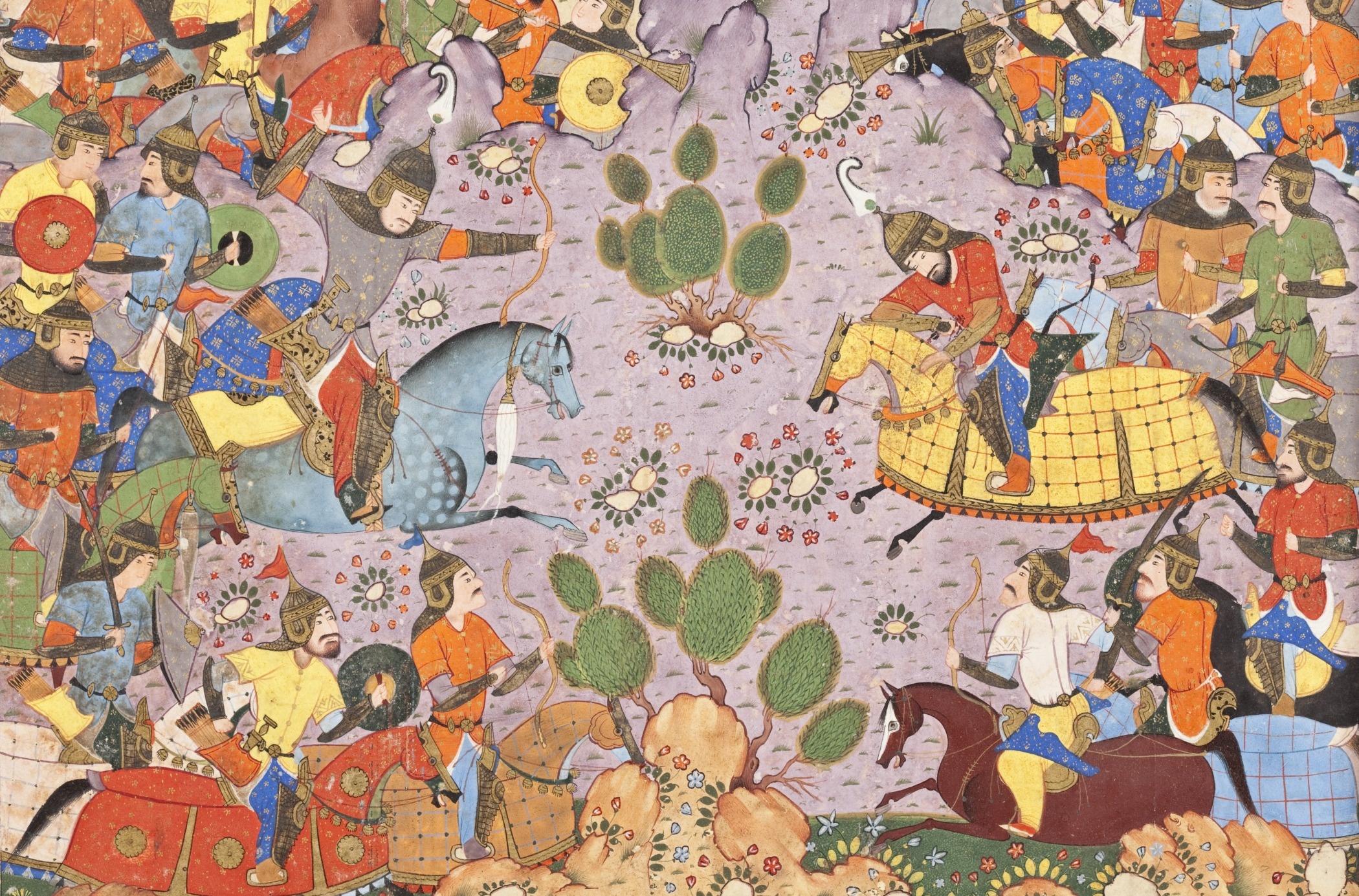
16th-century Shahnameh illustration of Bahram Chobin fighting Bagha Qaghan

In 588, the Turkic Khagan Bagha Qaghan (known as Sabeh/Saba in Persian sources), together with his Hephthalite subjects, invaded the Sasanian territories south of the Oxus, where they attacked and routed the Sasanian soldiers stationed in Balkh. After conquering the city, they proceeded to take Talaqan, Badghis, and Herat. The invasion was a violation of the treaty that Khosrow I and the Khagan Istemi had agreed to, which set the Oxus as the boundary between the empires. In a council of war, Bahram Chobin of the Parthian Mihranid family was chosen to lead an army against them and was given the governorship of Khorasan. Bahram's army, supposedly consisting of 12,000 hand-picked horsemen, ambushed a large army of Turks and Hephthalites in April 588, at the Battle of Hyrcanian Rock. By 589 he had repelled the Turks and entered Balkh triumphantly, where he captured the Turkic treasury and the golden throne of the Khagan. He then proceeded to cross the Oxus river and won a decisive victory over the Turks, personally killing Bagha Qaghan with an arrowshot. He managed to reach as far as Baykand, near Bukhara, and also contain an attack by the son of the deceased Khagan, Birmudha, whom Bahram had captured and sent to Ctesiphon.

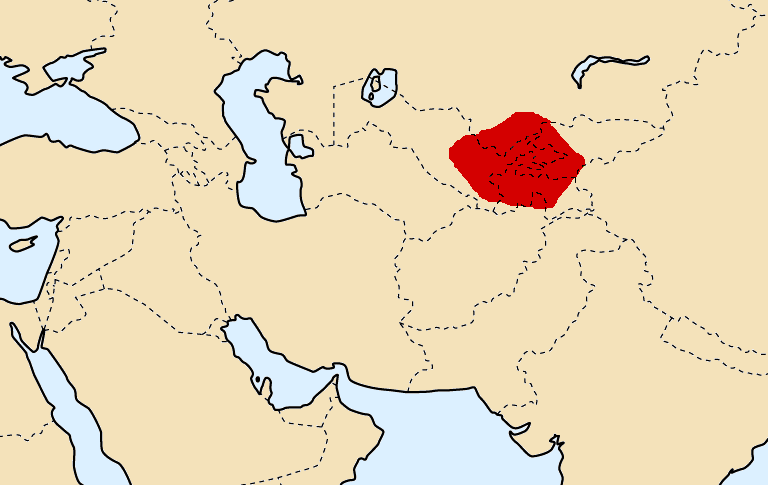
Map of Sogdia, which was briefly under Sasanian rule after the First Perso-Turkic War

Birmudha was well received there by Hormizd, who forty days later had him sent back to Bahram with the order that the Turkic prince should get sent back to Transoxiana. The Sasanians now held suzerainty over the Sogdian cities of Chach and Samarkand, where Hormizd minted coins. (Note: The Sasanians only managed to retain Chach and Samarkand for a few years, until it was re-captured by the Turks, who seemingly also conquered the eastern Sasanian province of Kadagistan.) This victory briefly made Iran the supreme power in Near East, a feat that was for a long time evoked in Persian stories. After Bahram's great victory against the Turks he was sent to Caucasus to repel an invasion of nomads, possibly the Khazars, where he was victorious. He was once again made commander of the Sasanian forces against the Byzantines, and successfully defeated a Byzantine force in Georgia. However, he then suffered a minor defeat by a Byzantine army on the banks of the Aras. Hormizd, who was jealous of Bahram, used this defeat as an excuse to dismiss him from his office, and had him humiliated.

According to one source, Bahram was the subject of jealousy by others after his victory against the Turks. Hormizd's minister Azen Gushnasp, who was reportedly jealous of Bahram, accused him of having kept the best part of the booty for himself and only sending a small part to Hormizd. According to other sources, it was Birmudha or the courtiers that raised Hormizd's suspicion. Regardless, Hormizd could not tolerate the rising fame of Bahram, and thus had him disgraced and removed from office for supposedly having kept some of the booty for himself. Furthermore, Hormizd sent him a chain and a spindle to show that he considered him as a lowly slave "as ungrateful as a woman". Enraged, Bahram, who was still in the east, rebelled against Hormizd. The version of Bahram rebelling after his defeat against the Byzantines was supported by Nöldeke in 1879. However, a source found ten years later confirmed Bahram's rebellion took in fact place while he was still in the east.

== Civil war ==
Map of northern Mesopotamia and its surroundings under the late Sasanians

Due to his noble status and great military knowledge, Bahram's soldiers and many others joined the rebellion, which marked the start of the Sasanian civil war of 589–591. Bahram then appointed a new governor for Khorasan, and afterwards set for Ctesiphon. The legitimacy of the House of Sasan had been established in the credence that the halo of kingship, the xwarrah, was given to the first Sasanian shah, Ardashir I (r. 224–242) and his family following the latter's conquest of the Parthian Empire (also known as the Arsacids). This was now, however, disputed by Bahram, thus marking the first time in Sasanian history that a Parthian dynasty challenged the legitimacy of the Sasanian family by rebelling.

He started circulating rumours based on an extract from the Zoroastrian holy book Bundahishn that implied by the end of Zoroaster's millennium, "a man shall come from the frontiers of Kavulistan, with whom there will be glory, also of the royal family, whom they will name Kay Bahram; and all men will return with him, and he will rule even over India, Rome, and Turkistan, over all the frontiers." Indeed, the Sasanians had misidentified Zoroaster's era with that of the Seleucids (312 BC), which put Bahram's life almost at the end of Zoroaster's millennium, he was therefore hailed by many as the promised savior Kay Bahram Varjavand. A verse in the Shahnameh seemingly indicates that Bahram proclaimed himself as the personification of the fire of the sun god Mithra, and that he swore to restore the religion and traditions of his ancestors, the Arsacids.

Hormizd sent a force under Sarames the Elder to arrest Bahram. He was, however, defeated by the latter, who had him trampled to death by an elephant. The route taken by Bahram was presumably the northern edge of the Iranian plateau, where in 590 he had repelled a Byzantine-funded attack by Iberians and others on Adurbadagan, and suffered a minor setback by a Byzantine force employed in Transcaucasia. He then marched southwards Media, where Sasanian monarchs, including Hormizd, ordinarily resided during the summer. Hormizd then left for the Great Zab River in order to cut communications between Ctesiphon and the Iranian soldiers on the Byzantine border. Around that time the soldiers, who were situated outside Nisibis, the chief city in northern Mesopotamia, rebelled against Hormizd and pledged their allegiance to Bahram when he reached the city.

The influence and popularity of Bahram continued to grow: Sasanian loyalist forces sent north against the Iranian rebels at Nisibis were flooded with rebel propaganda. The loyalist forces eventually also rebelled and killed their commander Chubriadanes, which made the position of Hormizd become unsustainable. He then sent an envoy to placate Bahram, while he started to make preparations to collect the royal treasure, destroy the bridge of the Tigris, and take sanctuary in al-Hira, the capital of the Lakhmids. A new Sasanian force was sent under the general Farrukhan to encounter Bahram. Shortly before the departure of the army, Hormizd had approved a request by Farrukhan. He had asked the king for the release of an aristocratic prisoner named Zadspram, whom he regarded as an important figure in his efforts against Bahram. The forces of Farrukhan and Bahram confronted each other at the Great Zab, but neither attacked, due to lack of confidence to cross the river. Farrukhan possibly hoped that the troops of Bahram would desert the latter; instead he was, however, deserted by Zadspram, and then eventually some of his officers, who murdered him.

=== Overthrow and death ===
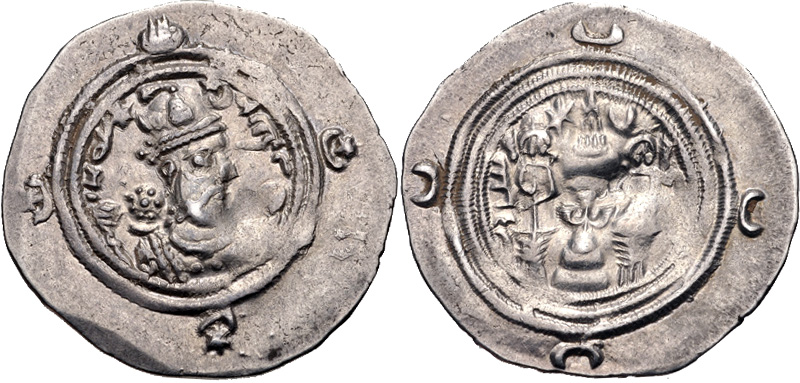
Drachma of Khosrow II, minted in 590

Hormizd, during his stay at Ctesiphon, was overthrown in a seemingly bloodless palace revolution by his brothers-in-law Vistahm and Vinduyih, who according to the Syriac writer Joshua the Stylite, both "equally hated Hormizd". They had Hormizd blinded with a red-hot needle, and put his oldest son Khosrow II (who was their nephew through his mother's side) on the throne. In June of 590, the two brothers strangled Hormizd to death with his own turban.

According to the 7th-century Byzantine historian Theophylact Simocatta, Khosrow II was involved in the murder of his father, while the 9th-century Muslim historian Abu Hanifa Dinawari, who based his account on the now lost Middle Persian work The Book of Bahram Chobin, does not involve Khosrow II. Sebeos, who was hostile to Khosrow II, likewise does not accuse him of patricide. Propaganda circulated by Bahram, however, condemned Khosrow II for the death of his father. The modern historian Michael Bonner is skeptical of Theophylact's account, which he deems to have chronological issues. Bahram continued his march to Ctesiphon, now with the pretext of claiming to avenge Hormizd. Hormizd's death continued to be a controversial matter—a few years later, Khosrow II ordered the execution of both his uncles as well as other nobles who had a hand in the killing of his father. A few decades later, Khosrow II, after being overthrown in a coup by his son Kavad II, was accused of regicide against his father.

== Religious policy and beliefs ==
Hormizd, like all other Sasanian rulers, was an adherent of Zoroastrianism. Since the 5th century, the Sasanian monarchs had been made aware of the significance of the religious minorities in the realm, and as a result tried to homogenize them into a structure of administration where according to legal principles, all would be treated straightforwardly as mard / zan ī šahr, i.e. "man/woman citizen (of the Empire)". Jews and (notably) Christians had accepted the concept of Iran and considered themselves part of the nation. Hormizd, aware of the importance of the Christians and their support, refused to attack them when asked by the Zoroastrian clergy, whom he reportedly urged to acknowledge the input of the Christians. According to al-Tabari's History of Prophets and Kings and the Chronicle of Seert, which both drew some of their work from the Middle Persian history book Khwaday-Namag ("Book of Lords"), Hormizd told the clergy:

"Just as our royal throne cannot stand on its two front legs without the two back ones, our kingdom cannot stand or endure firmly if we cause the Christians and adherents of other faiths, who differ in belief from ourselves, to become hostile to us. So refrain from harming the Christians and become assiduous in good works, so that the Christians and the adherents of other faiths may see this, praise you for it, and feel themselves drawn toward your religion."

His tolerance towards the Christians earned him the gratitude of their priests, and the respect of the patriarch Ezekiel and his successor Ishoyahb I. Hormizd was himself married to a Christian woman and prayed to the martyr St. Sergius, a military saint whose cult rapidly increased beyond political and cultural borders from the 5th to the 7th century. He was as a result suspected of harboring Christian beliefs. However, his son Khosrow II also paid tribute to Sergius, more than once. Hormizd superstitiously wore a talisman against death, and stressed the importance of astrology.

== Coinage ==
On the reverse of his coins, Hormizd is depicted wearing a crown equivalent to that of the second worn by his great-grandfather Peroz I (r. 459–484). The crown consists of a diadem, a crown with crenellations in the middle and behind, and the korymbos, with a moon crescent at the front. Hormizd made use of astral symbols on the obverse side—stars and crescents are present at 3, 6, and 9 o'clock. Gold coins were rarely minted under the Sasanians, with Hormizd being one of the rulers to never mint them.

== Family ==
Two of Hormizd's wives are known, one of them being an Ispahbudhan noblewoman, who was the daughter of Shapur, whilst the other one was a Christian woman.

Besides Khosrow II (r. 590–628), Hormizd also had an unnamed daughter, who married Shahrbaraz of the House of Mihran.

== Sources ==
- Al-Tabari, Abu Ja'far Muhammad ibn Jarir (1985–2007). Ehsan Yar-Shater (ed.). The History of Al-Ṭabarī. Vol. 40 vols. Albany, NY: State University of New York Press.
- Axworthy, Michael (2008). A History of Iran: Empire of the Mind. New York: Basic Books. pp. 1–368. ISBN 978-0-465-00888-9.
- Bonner, Michael (2020). The Last Empire of Iran. Piscataway, NJ: Gorgias Press. pp. 1–406. ISBN 978-1-4632-0616-1.
- Curtis, Vesta Sarkhosh (1999). "Some observations on coins of Peroz and Kavad I". M. Alram and D.e. Klimburg-Salter (Eds) Coins, Art and Archaeology. Essays on the Pre-Islamic History of the Indo -Iranian Borderlands: 303–313.
- Daryaee, Touraj (2014). Sasanian Persia: The Rise and Fall of an Empire. I.B.Tauris. pp. 1–240. ISBN 978-0-85771-666-8.
- Daryaee, Touraj; Rezakhani, Khodadad (2016). From Oxus to Euphrates: The World of Late Antique Iran. H&S Media. pp. 1–126. ISBN 978-1-78083-577-8.
- Greatrex, Geoffrey; Lieu, Samuel N. C. (2002). The Roman Eastern Frontier and the Persian Wars (Part II, 363–630 AD). New York, New York and London, United Kingdom: Routledge (Taylor & Francis). ISBN 0-415-14687-9.
- Howard-Johnston, James (2010). "Ḵosrow II". Encyclopaedia Iranica, Online Edition.
- Jaques, Tony (2007). Dictionary of Battles and Sieges: F-O. Greenwood Publishing Group. pp. 1–1354. ISBN 978-0-313-33538-9.
- Kia, Mehrdad (2016). The Persian Empire: A Historical Encyclopedia [2 volumes]: A Historical Encyclopedia. ABC-CLIO. ISBN 978-1-61069-391-2.
- Litvinsky, B. A.; Dani, Ahmad Hasan (1996). History of Civilizations of Central Asia: The crossroads of civilizations, A.D. 250 to 750. Vol. III. UNESCO. ISBN 978-92-3-103211-0.
- Martindale, John Robert; Jones, Arnold Hugh Martin; Morris, J., eds. (1992). The Prosopography of the Later Roman Empire, Volume III: A.D. 527–641. Cambridge, United Kingdom: Cambridge University Press. ISBN 978-0-521-20160-5.
- Payne, Richard E. (2015). A State of Mixture: Christians, Zoroastrians, and Iranian Political Culture in Late Antiquity. Univ of California Press. pp. 1–320. ISBN 978-0-520-96153-1.
- Pourshariati, Parvaneh (2008). Decline and Fall of the Sasanian Empire: The Sasanian-Parthian Confederacy and the Arab Conquest of Iran (PDF). London and New York: I.B. Tauris. ISBN 978-1-84511-645-3.
- Rapp, Stephen H. Jr (2014). The Sasanian World through Georgian Eyes: Caucasia and the Iranian Commonwealth in Late Antique Georgian Literature. Routledge. ISBN 978-1-4724-2552-2.
- Rezakhani, Khodadad (2017). "East Iran in Late Antiquity". ReOrienting the Sasanians: East Iran in Late Antiquity. Edinburgh University Press. pp. 1–256. ISBN 978-1-4744-0030-5. JSTOR 10.3366/j.ctt1g04zr8. (registration required)
- Schindel, Nikolaus (2013). "Sasanian Coinage". In Potts, Daniel T. (ed.). The Oxford Handbook of Ancient Iran. Oxford University Press. ISBN 978-0-19-973330-9.
- Schmitt, R.; Bailey, H. W. (1986). "ARMENIA AND IRAN iv. Iranian influences in Armenian Language". Encyclopaedia Iranica, Vol. II, Fasc. 4-5. pp. 445–465.
- Sebeos (1999). The Armenian History Attributed to Sebeos, Part I: Translation and Notes. Translated, with notes, by R. W. Thomson. Historical commentary by James Howard-Johnston. Assistance from Tim Greenwood. Liverpool University Press. ISBN 0-85323-564-3.
- Shahbazi, A. Sh. (1988). "Bahrām VI Čōbīn". Encyclopaedia Iranica, Vol. III, Fasc. 5. London et al. pp. 514–522.
- Shahbazi, A. Shapur (1989). "Besṭām o Bendōy". Encyclopaedia Iranica, Vol. IV, Fasc. 2. pp. 180–182.
- Shahbazi, A. Shapur (2004). "Hormozd IV". Encyclopaedia Iranica, Vol. XII, Fasc. 5. pp. 466–467.
- Shahîd, Irfan (1995). Byzantium and the Arabs in the Sixth Century, Volume 1. Washington, District of Columbia: Dumbarton Oaks. ISBN 978-0-88402-214-5.
- Shayegan, M. Rahim (2004). "Hormozd I". Encyclopaedia Iranica, Vol. XII, Fasc. 5. pp. 462–464.
- Shayegan, M. Rahim (2017). "Sasanian political ideology". In Potts, Daniel T. (ed.). The Oxford Handbook of Ancient Iran. Oxford University Press. pp. 1–1021. ISBN 978-0-19-066866-2.
- Suny, Ronald Grigor (1994). The Making of the Georgian Nation. Indiana University Press. pp. 1–418. ISBN 978-0-253-20915-3.
- Tafazzoli, A. (1988). "Āẕīn Jošnas". Encyclopaedia Iranica, Vol. III, Fasc. 3. p. 260.
- Vevaina, Yuhan; Canepa, Matthew (2018). "Ohrmazd". In Nicholson, Oliver (ed.). The Oxford Dictionary of Late Antiquity. Oxford: Oxford University Press. ISBN 978-0-19-866277-8.
- Warren, Soward. Theophylact Simocatta and the Persians. Sasanika.
- Whitby, Michael; Whitby, Mary (1986). The History of Theophylact Simocatta. Oxford, United Kingdom: Clarendon Press. ISBN 978-0-19-822799-1.

=== Further reading ===
- Crawford, Peter (2013). The War of the Three Gods: Romans, Persians and the Rise of Islam. Pen and Sword. ISBN 978-1-84884-612-8.
- Foss, Clive (October 1975). "The Persians in Asia Minor and the End of Antiquity". The English Historical Review. XC (CCCLVII): 721–47. doi:10.1093/ehr/XC.CCCLVII.721.
- Frye, Richard Nelson (1984). The History of Ancient Iran. C.H. Beck. pp. 1–411. ISBN 978-3-406-09397-5.
- Oman, Charles (1893). Europe, 476-918, Volume 1. Macmillan.
- Potts, Daniel T. (2014). Nomadism in Iran: From Antiquity to the Modern Era. London and New York: Oxford University Press. pp. 1–558. ISBN 978-0-19-933079-9.
- Rawlinson, George (2004). The Seven Great Monarchies of the Ancient Eastern World. Vol. 3. Gorgias Press. ISBN 978-1-59333-171-9. (Old edition on the Internet Archive.)
- Shahbazi, A. Shapur (2005). "Sasanian dynasty". Encyclopaedia Iranica, Online Edition.

Hormizd IV Sasanian dynasty Born: c. 540 Died: June 590
Preceded by Khosrow I	King of Kings of Iran and non-Iran; 579–590	Succeeded by Bahram Chobin (rival king); Khosrow II (successor)
