= Vistahm =

- King of Kings of Iranians and non-Iranians
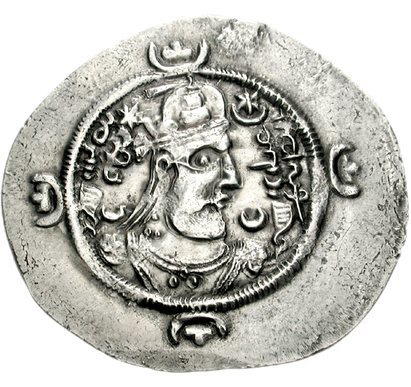
- Coin of Vistahm, minted at Ray in 595/6.

Rival Shahanshah of the Sasanian Empire
- Reign: 590/1–596 or 594/5–600
- Predecessor: Khosrow II
- Successor: Khosrow II
- Died: 596 or 600
- Spouse: Gordiya
- House: Ispahbudhan
- Father: Shapur
- Religion: Zoroastrianism

Vistahm or Bistam (also transliterated Wistaxm, Middle Persian: 𐭥𐭮𐭲𐭧𐭬 wsthm), was a Parthian dynast of the Ispahbudhan house, and maternal uncle of the Sasanian king of kings of Iran, Khosrow II (r. 590–628). Vistahm helped Khosrow regain his throne after the rebellion of another Parthian noble Bahram Chobin, of the House of Mihran, but later led a revolt himself, and ruled independently over a region which encompassed the entire Iranian East until he was defeated by Khosrow and his allies.

== Early life ==
Vistahm and his brother Vinduyih were sons of Shapur and grandsons of Bawi. They belonged to the Ispahbudhan, one of the seven Parthian clans that formed the elite aristocracy of the Sasanian Empire. The Ispahbudhan in particular enjoyed such a high status that they were acknowledged as "kin and partners of the Sasanians". The family also held the important position of spahbed of the West, i.e. the Sasanian Empire's southwestern regions (the Sawad). A sister of Vistahm had even married the Sasanian shah Hormizd IV (r. 579–590), and was the mother of Hormizd's heir, Khosrow II.

Nevertheless, the family suffered, along with the other aristocratic clans, during the persecutions launched by Hormizd IV in his later years: Shapur was murdered, and Vistahm succeeded his father as spahbed of the West. Finally, Hormizd's persecutions led to the revolt of the general Bahram Chobin in 590. Bahram, whose revolt quickly attracted widespread support, marched on the capital, Ctesiphon. There Hormizd tried to sideline the two Ispahbudhan, but was dissuaded, according to Sebeos, by his son, Khosrow II. Vinduyih was imprisoned, but Vistahm apparently fled the court; soon after, however, the two brothers appear as the leaders of a palace coup that deposed, blinded and killed Hormizd, raising his son Khosrow to the throne. Unable to oppose Bahram's march on Ctesiphon, however, Khosrow and the two brothers fled to Azerbaijan. Vistahm remained behind to rally troops, while Vinduyih escorted Khosrow to seek aid from the East Romans. On their way, they were overtaken by Bahram's troops, but Vinduyih, pretending to his nephew, allowed himself to be captured to ensure Khosrow's escape. In early 591 Khosrow returned with military aid from the East Romans, and was joined by 12,000 Armenian cavalry and 8,000 troops from Azerbaijan raised by Vistahm. In the Battle of Blarathon, Bahram's army suffered a crushing defeat, and Khosrow II reclaimed Ctesiphon and his throne.

The modern historian Stephen H. Rapp notes that Vistahm is possibly identical to the Ustam mentioned in the Georgian sources, the Sasanian commandant (c‛ixist‛avi in Georgian) of Mtskheta in Sasanian Iberia. Rapp adds that if the two indeed happen to be the same person, it shows that the marzban and c‛ixist‛avi of Iberia were Sasanian agents representing different and rival Parthian houses. This, in turn, may have been a manoeuvre devised on purpose by the Sasanian rulers to "exploit intra-Parthian tensions so as to thwart the possibility of a united front in Caucasia against the empire".

== Later life and rebellion ==
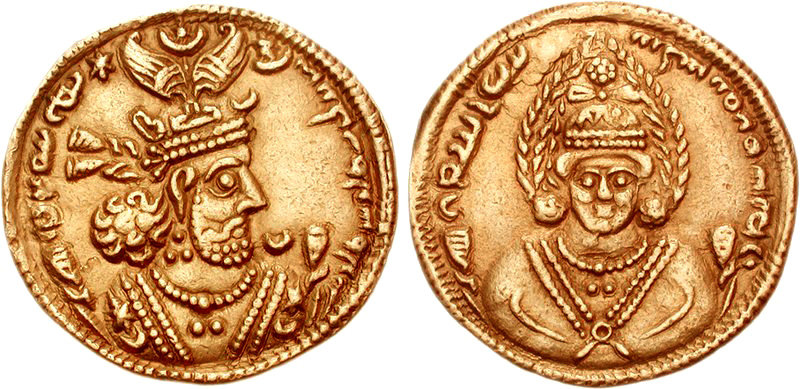
Coin of Khosrow II.

After his victory, Khosrow rewarded his uncles with high positions: Vinduyih became treasurer and first minister and Vistahm received the post of spahbed of the East, encompassing Tabaristan and Khorasan, which according to Sebeos was also the traditional homeland of the Ispahbudhan. Soon, however, Khosrow changed his intentions: trying to disassociate himself from his father's murder, the shah decided to execute his uncles. The Sasanian monarchs' traditional mistrust of over-powerful magnates and Khosrow's personal resentment of Vinduyih's patronising manner certainly contributed to this decision. Vinduyih was soon put to death, according to a Syriac source captured while trying to flee to his brother in the East.

At the news of his brother's murder, Vistahm rose in open revolt. According to Dinawari, Vistahm sent a letter to Khosrow announcing his claim to the throne through his Parthian (Arsacid) heritage: "You are not worthier to rule than I am. Indeed, I am more deserving on account of my descent from Darius, son of Darius, who fought Alexander. You Sasanians deceitfully gained superiority over us [the Arsacids] and usurped our right, and treated us with injustice. Your ancestor Sasan was no more than a shepherd." Vistahm's revolt, like Bahram's shortly before, found support and spread quickly. Local magnates as well as the remnants of Bahram Chobin's armies flocked to him, especially after he married Bahram's sister Gordiya. Vistahm repelled several loyalist efforts to subdue him, and he soon held sway in the entire eastern and northern quadrants of the Iranian realm, a domain stretching from the Oxus river to the region of Ardabil in the west. He even campaigned in the east, where he subdued two Hephthalite princes of Transoxiana, Shaug and Pariowk. The date of Vistahm's uprising is uncertain. From his coinage, it is known that his rebellion lasted for seven years. The commonly accepted dates are ca. 590–596, but some scholars like J.D. Howard–Johnston and P. Pourshariati push its outbreak later, in 594/5, to coincide with the Armenian Vahewuni rebellion.

As Vistahm began to threaten Media, Khosrow sent several armies against his uncle, but failed to achieve a decisive result: Vistahm and his followers retreated to the mountainous region of Gilan, while several Armenian contingents of the royal army rebelled and defected to Vistahm. Finally, Khosrow called upon the services of the Armenian Smbat Bagratuni, who engaged Vistahm near Qumis. During the battle, Vistahm was murdered by Pariowk at Khosrow's urging (or, according to an alternative account, by his wife Gordiya). Nevertheless, Vistahm's troops managed to repel the royal army at Qumis, and it required another expedition by Smbat in the next year to finally end the rebellion.

== Legacy ==
Despite Vistahm's rebellion and death, the power of the Ispahbudhan family was too great to be broken. Indeed, one of Vinduyih's sons was instrumental in the trial of Khosrow II after his deposition in 628, and two of the sons of Vistahm, Vinduyih and Tiruyih, along with their cousin Narsi, were commanders in the Iranian army that confronted the Muslim Arabs in 634.

The town of Bastam in Iran as well as the monumental site of Taq-e Bostan may have been named after Vistahm.

== Family tree ==
Legend
Orange	King of Kings	Yellow	King

Bawi
Shapur
Vinduyih	Vistahm
Farrukh Hormizd	Tiruyih	Vinduyih
Rostam Farrokhzad	Farrukhzad
Shahram	Surkhab I	Isfandyadh	Bahram	Farrukhan

== Sources ==
- Howard-Johnston, James (2010). "ḴOSROW II". Encyclopaedia Iranica, Online Edition.
- Martindale, John Robert; Jones, Arnold Hugh Martin; Morris, J., eds. (1992). The Prosopography of the Later Roman Empire, Volume III: A.D. 527–641. Cambridge: Cambridge University Press. ISBN 978-0-521-20160-5.
- Pourshariati, Parvaneh (2008). Decline and Fall of the Sasanian Empire: The Sasanian-Parthian Confederacy and the Arab Conquest of Iran. London and New York: I.B. Tauris. ISBN 978-1-84511-645-3.
- Shapur Shahbazi, A. (1989). "BESṬĀM O BENDŌY". Encyclopaedia Iranica, Vol. IV, Fasc. 2. pp. 180–182.

Vistahm House of Ispahbudhan
Preceded by Khosrow II	King of Kings of Iran and non-Iran; 590/1–596 or 594/5–600	Succeeded by Khosrow II
