= Perso-Turkic war of 588–589 =

Central Asian war

Perso-Turkic War 588–589
- Part of Göktürk–Persian wars
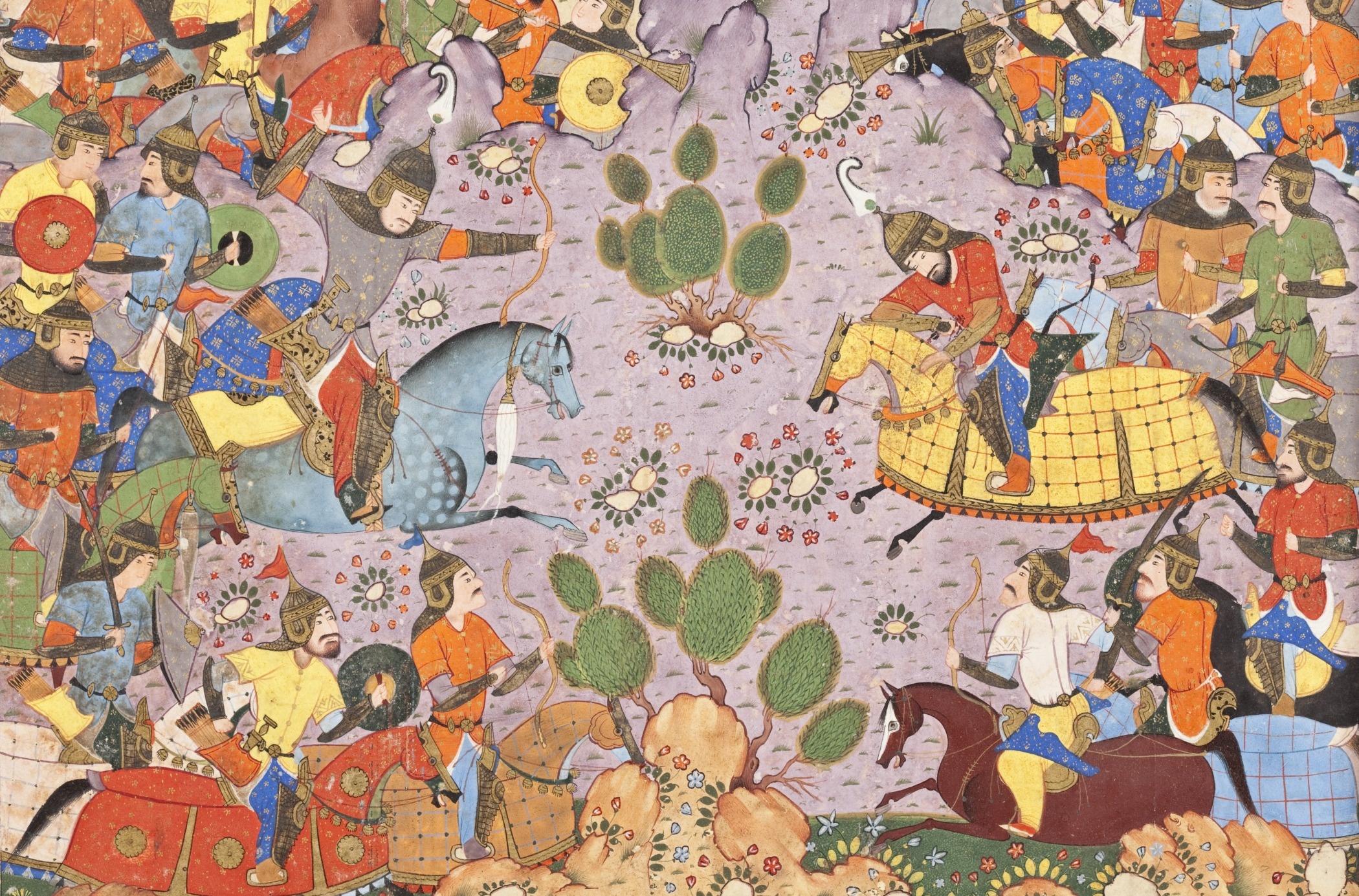
- Shahnameh illustration of Bahram Chobin fighting King Sawa
Date	588–589
Location	Greater Khorasan, Transoxiana
Result	Sasanian victory
Territorial changes	The Sasanians reconquer the lands south of the Oxus and also capture Chach and Samarkand

Belligerents
Sasanian Empire	Western Turkic Khaganate; Hephthalite principalities

Commanders and leaders
Bahram Chobin; Bahram Siyavashan; Nadre Gushnasp; Izad Gushnasp	Bagha Qaghan †; Yil-Tegin (POW); Birmudha-tigin (POW)

Strength
12,000	Unknown

The Perso-Turkic War was fought during 588 and 589 between the Sasanian Empire and Hephthalite principalities and its lord the Göktürks. The conflict started with the invasion of the Sasanian Empire by the Göktürks and ended with a decisive Sasanian victory and the reconquest of lost lands.

== Background ==
In 557, Khosrow I (r. 531–579), the king (shah) of the Sasanian Empire, who had greatly increased the authority of his empire, decided to put an end to the Hephthalite Empire's domination over Central Asia. He thus allied with the Göktürks to defeat the Hephthalites. The campaign was successful and the region north of the Oxus went to the Göktürks whilst the south came under Sasanian rule. An agreement was established between Khosrow I and the Turkic khagan Istämi which set the Oxus as the frontier between the two empires. However, in 588, the Western Turkic Khaganate under Bagha Qaghan, together with its Hephthalite subjects, invaded the Sasanian territories south of the Oxus, where they attacked and routed the Sasanian soldiers stationed in Balkh, and then proceeded to conquer the city along with Talaqan, Badghis, and Herat.

== War ==
An emergency council of war was held in Ctesiphon in which Bahram Chobin, a cavalry commander from the Parthian noble family of Mihran, was chosen to lead an army against the Göktürks and was given the governorship of Khorasan. Bahram's army gathered at Nishapur and consisted of 12,000 hand-picked soldiers, which included cavalry, Daylamite infantry, and war elephants.

In 588, the Sasanians set out from Nishapur to confront the Göktürks in eastern Khorasan, where they met to battle. Bahram organized his forces by placing his infantry in the center with the cavalry directly behind them and war elephants on the right and left. Bahram selected 100 Pahlavan soldiers to accompany him on an ambush at the position of Bagha Qaghan, where he was seated on a golden throne observing the battle. The battle began with the Sasanian war elephants on the right and left attacking the Turkic flanks on both sides, followed by the Sasanian infantry splitting to allow the cavalry behind them to smash into the Turkic center. Meanwhile, Bahram and the 100 Pahlavans assaulted the Bagha Qaghan's position. The Bagha's bodyguards were slaughtered, and Bagha was killed. The Bagha's son, Yil-Tegin, managed to escape along with some others to a castle named Avaze. Bahram Chobin's army pursued Yil-Tegin and besieged the castle, eventually forcing the Göktürks to surrender.

In 589, the Sasanians re-conquered Herat and Balkh, where Bahram captured the Turkic treasury and the Khagan's golden throne. He then proceeded to cross the Oxus river and won a decisive victory over the Eastern Turks, personally killing a "great khan", with an arrowshot. He reached as far as Baykand, near Bukhara, and also contained an attack by the son of the deceased Khagan, Birmudha, whom Bahram had captured and sent to the Sasanian capital of Ctesiphon. Birmudha was well received there, and forty days later was sent back to Bahram with the order that the Turkic prince should be sent back to Transoxiana. The Sasanians now held suzerainty over the Sogdian cities of Chach and Samarkand, where the Sasanian shah, Hormizd IV, minted coins.

Ferdowsi's Shahnameh (C.E. 1010) describes in legendary detail the dealings of Bahram Chobin and the Turkic "King Sawa" before and during the battle in which Bahram with his 12,000 men kills Sawa.

== Sources ==
- Bivar, A. D. H. (2003). "Hephthalites". Encyclopaedia Iranica. Vol. XII, Fasc. 2. pp. 198–201.
- Frye, Richard Nelson (1984). The History of Ancient Iran. C.H.Beck. pp. 1–411. ISBN 9783406093975. "The history of ancient iran."
- Howard-Johnston, James. "Ḵosrow II". Encyclopaedia Iranica, Online Edition.
- Jaques, Tony (2007). Dictionary of Battles and Sieges: F-O. Greenwood Publishing Group. pp. 1–1354. ISBN 9780313335389.
- Litvinsky, B. A.; Dani, Ahmad Hasan (1996). History of Civilizations of Central Asia: The crossroads of civilizations, A.D. 250 to 750. UNESCO. pp. 1–569. ISBN 9789231032110.
- Pourshariati, Parvaneh (2017). Decline and Fall of the Sasanian Empire. I.B. Tauris.
- Rezakhani, Khodadad (2017). ReOrienting the Sasanians: East Iran in Late Antiquity. Edinburgh University Press. pp. 1–256. ISBN 9781474400305.
- Shahbazi, A. Sh. (1988). "Bahrām VI Čōbīn". Encyclopaedia Iranica. Vol. III, Fasc. 5. pp. 514–522.
- Sims-Williams, Nicholas (2009). "Kadagistān". Encyclopaedia Iranica. Vol. XV, Fasc. 3. pp. 324–325.
