= Vinduyih =

Sasanian nobleman

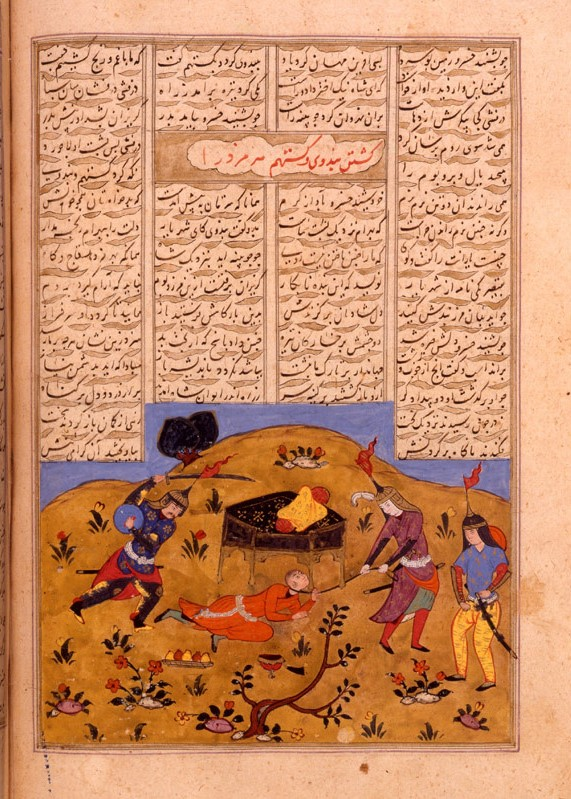
Shahnameh folio depicting Vinduyih and his brother Vistahm killing the Sasanian monarch Hormizd IV

Vinduyih (Middle Persian: Windōē) or Bendoy (Persian: بندوی) was a Sasanian nobleman from the Ispahbudhan family. His sister was the mother of Khosrau II, thus making Vinduyih the uncle of Khosrau. Vinduyih and Vistahm played an important role in restoring the throne for Khosrau II from Bahram Chobin. He was later deposed in Ctesiphon by the orders of Khosrau II.

== Family tree ==
Bawi
Shapur
Vinduyih	Vistahm
Farrukh Hormizd	Tiruyih	Vinduyih
Rostam Farrokhzād	Farrukhzad
Shahram	Surkhab I	Isfandyadh	Bahram	Farrukhan
