= Khosrow I =

Shahanshah of the Sasanian Empire from 531 to 579

Khosrow I Xosrōe 𐭧𐭥𐭮𐭫𐭥𐭣𐭩
- King of Kings of Iranians and non-Iranians
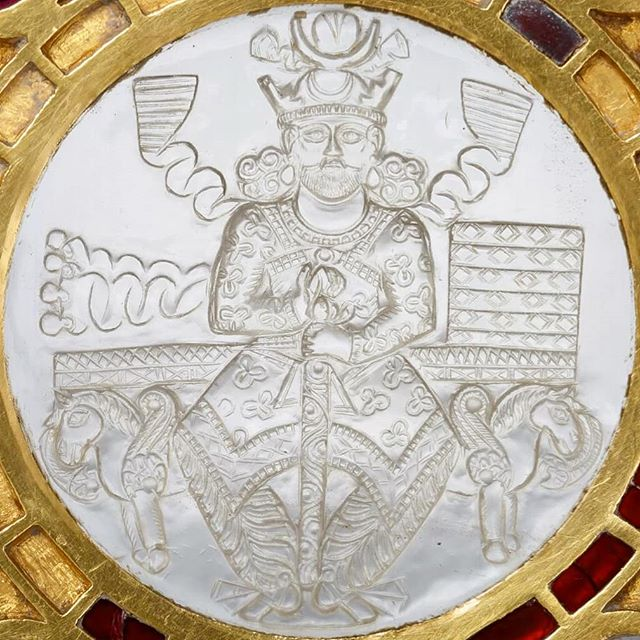
- Khosrow I on an ornamental plate in BnF Museum

Shahanshah of the Sasanian Empire
- Reign: 13 September 531 – February 579
- Predecessor: Kavad I
- Successor: Hormizd IV
- Born: 512–514; Ardestan, Sasanian Empire
- Died: February 579 (aged 65–67); Ctesiphon, Sasanian Empire
- Issue: Hormizd IV; Anoshazad; Yazdandar
- House: Sasan
- Father: Kavad I
- Mother: Ispahbudhan noblewoman
- Religion: Zoroastrianism

Khosrow I (also spelled Khosrau, Khusro or Chosroes; Middle Persian: 𐭧𐭥𐭮𐭫𐭥𐭣𐭩), traditionally known by his epithet of Anushirvan (Middle Persian: 𐭠𐭭𐭥𐭱𐭫𐭥𐭡𐭠𐭭, lit. 'the Immortal Soul'), was the Sasanian King of Kings of Iran from 531 to 579. He was the son and successor of Kavad I (r. 488–496, 498/499–531).

Inheriting a reinvigorated empire at war with the Byzantines, Khosrow I signed a peace treaty with them in 532, known as the Perpetual Peace, in which the Byzantine emperor Justinian I paid 11,000 pounds of gold to the Sasanians. Khosrow then focused on consolidating his power, executing conspirators, including his uncle Bawi. Dissatisfied with the actions of the Byzantine clients and vassals, the Ghassanids, and encouraged by Ostrogoth envoys from Italy, Khosrow violated the peace treaty and declared war against the Byzantines in 540. He sacked the major city of Antioch and deported its population to Persia. In 541, he invaded Lazica and made it an Iranian protectorate, thus initiating the Lazic War. In 545, the two empires agreed to halt the wars in Mesopotamia and Syria while continuing to fight in Lazica. A truce was declared in 557, and by 562 the fifty-year peace treaty was signed.

In 572, Justin II, the successor of Justinian, broke the peace treaty and sent a Byzantine force into the Sasanian region of Arzanene. The following year, Khosrow besieged and captured the important Byzantine fortress-city of Dara, which led to Justin II's insanity. The war lasted until 591, outliving Khosrow. Khosrow's wars were not only focused in the west. To the east, in an alliance with the Göktürks, he finally put an end to the Hephthalite Empire, which had inflicted a handful of defeats on the Sasanians in the 5th century, killing Khosrow's grandfather Peroz I. To the south, Iranian forces led by Wahrez defeated the Aksumites and conquered Yemen.

Khosrow I is known for his character, virtue and knowledge. During his ambitious reign, he continued his father's project of making major social, military, and economic reforms, promoting the welfare of the people, increasing state revenues, establishing a professional army, and founding or rebuilding many cities, palaces, and much infrastructure. He was interested in literature and philosophy, and under his reign, art and science flourished in Iran. He was the most distinguished of the Sasanian kings, and his name became a royal title, like that of Caesar in Roman history.

At the time of his death, the Sasanian Empire had reached its greatest extent since Shapur II, stretching from Yemen in the west to Gandhara in the east. He was succeeded by his son Hormizd IV.

== Name and titles ==
Khosrow is the New Persian variant of his name used by scholars; his original name was Middle Persian, Husraw, itself derived from Avestan Haosrauuah ("he who has good fame"). The name is rendered in Greek as Chosroes (Χοσρόης) and in Arabic as Kisra. Besides his personal name, he is widely known in sources by his epithet of Anushirvan ("the Immortal Soul"), a New Persian rendering of Middle Persian anūšag-ruwān. He received this title after his death to distinguish him from Khosrow II. It referred to his religious reforms and promotion of the prosperity of the realm and probably also connected him with the mythical immortal king Kay Khosrow (both were remembered as pious kings and "restorers" of the faith). Other variants of the name are Anoshirvan, Anushiravan and Nowshīrvān. Khosrow was also known by the epithets Dādgar ("Dispenser of Justice") and, in Islamic times, 'Adel ("the Just").

== Historiography ==
Many sources dating to the Islamic era, such as the Arabic History of the Prophets and Kings by al-Tabari and the medieval Persian epic Shahnameh ("Book of Kings") by Ferdowsi (d. 1020), give much information regarding Khosrow's reforms, and thus most likely drew both of their information from the Middle Persian history book Khwaday-Namag ("Book of Lords"). Other works were made independently, such as the Sirat Anushirwan, which was reportedly an autobiography made by Khosrow himself, and survives in the work of Miskawayh (932–1030). Khosrow is also mentioned in several Greek sources, such as those of Procopius, Agathias and Menander Protector, who all give important information regarding Khosrow's management of the Irano-Roman wars. Syriac authors such as John of Ephesus and Zacharias Rhetor also include Khosrow in their work, offering a perspective of the consequences that his expeditions brought on the people who lived on the Roman border.

== Background ==
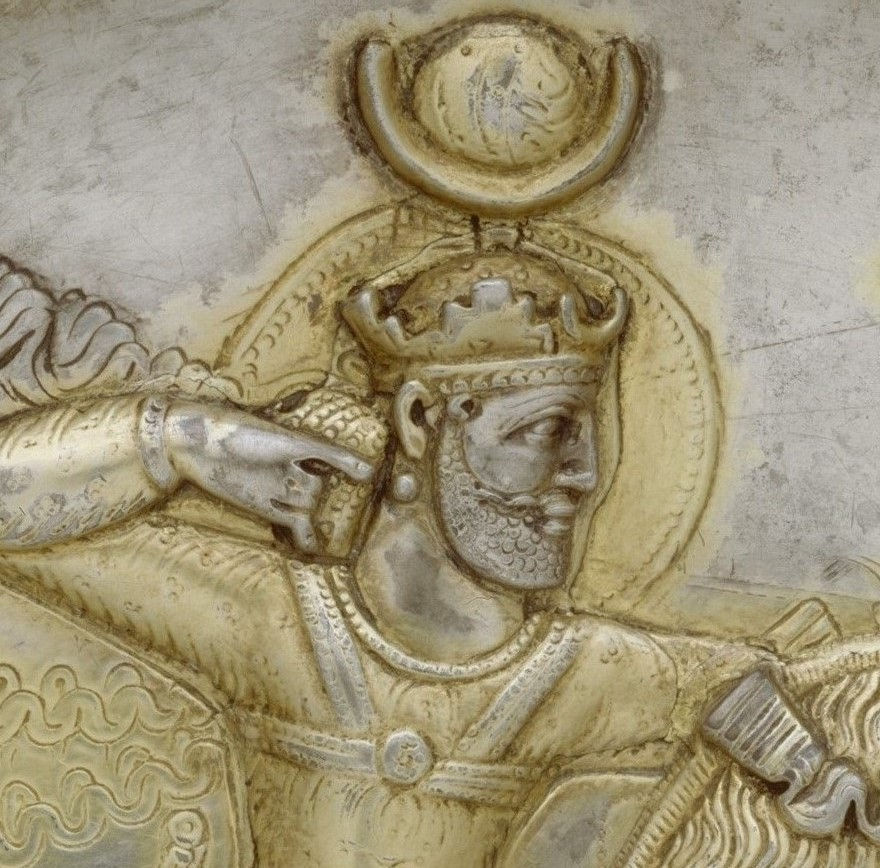
Kavad I on a Sassanid plate

Khosrow I was reportedly born between 512 and 514 at Ardestan, a town located in the Spahan province in central Iran. The town, dating back to the Achaemenid period, thrived during Khosrow's age, and also included a fire temple, which was said to be founded by the mythological Kayanian king Kay Bahman, from whom the Sasanians claimed their descent. Khosrow was the youngest son of Kavad I, the ruling Sasanian shah. His mother was an Ispahbudhan princess, who was the sister of the leading Iranian general Bawi. The Ispahbudhan were one of the Seven Great Houses of Iran that formed the elite aristocracy of the Sasanian Empire. In particular, they enjoyed such a high status that they were acknowledged as "kin and partners of the Sasanians". The family also held the important position of spahbed of the West, i.e., the Sasanian Empire's southwestern regions (Khwarwaran).

Following the tradition of the aristocratic or upper-class families, Khosrow would have started at school (frahangestān) between the ages of five and seven. There he would learn to write and would learn the yashts, Hadokht, Bayān Yasn and Vendidad, following the same pattern of schooling made for a future priest (herbed). Furthermore, he would listen to the Middle Persian translation of the Avesta, the Zend. Afterwards, he would be schooled in riding, archery, polo (chovgan) and military creativity.

== Early life ==
=== Negotiations with the Byzantines over the adoption of Khosrow ===
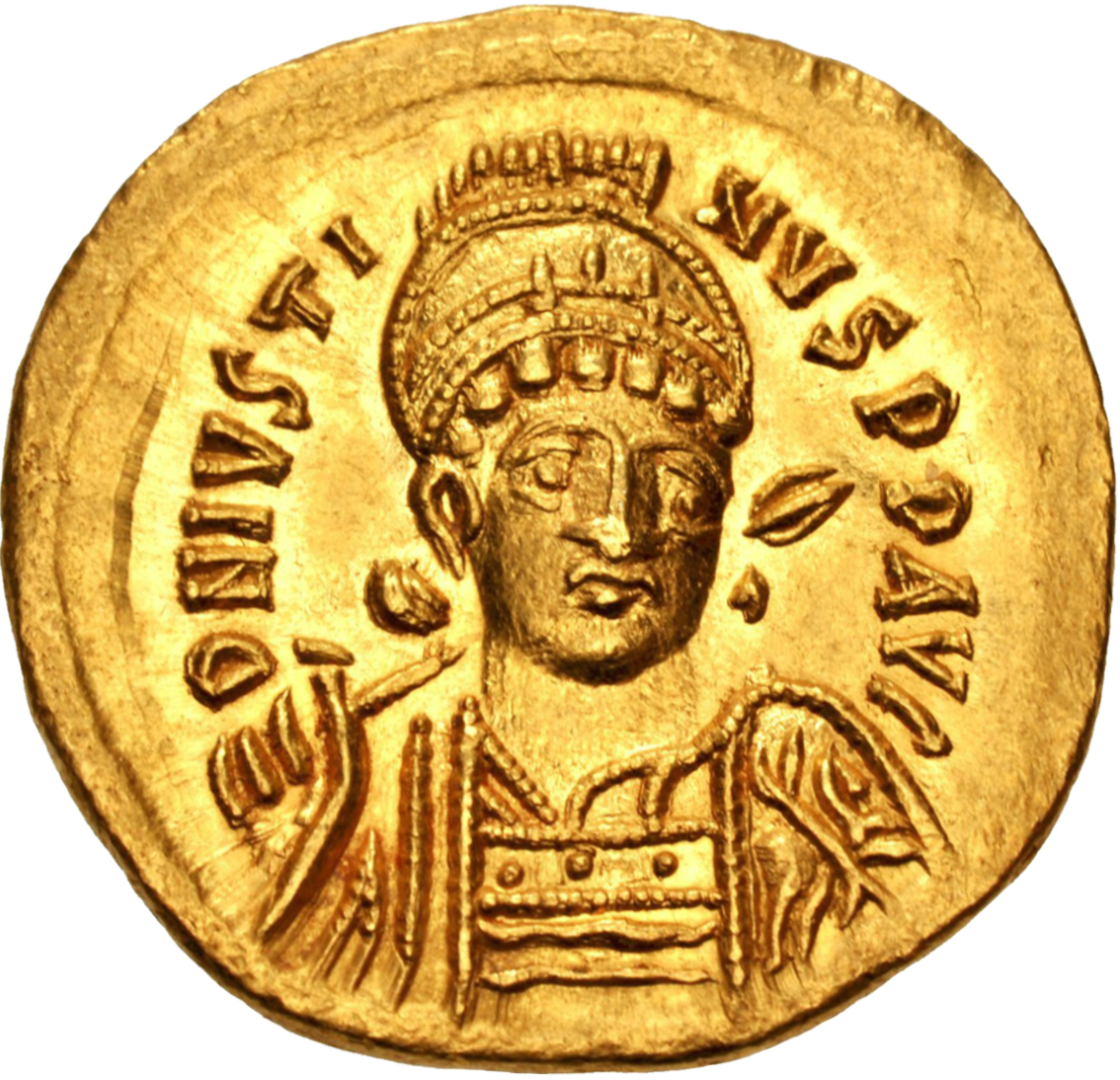
Solidus of the Byzantine emperor Justin I

Despite his early successes in the Anastasian war, Kavad feared continued conflict with the Byazntines in the face of threats from nomadic tribes along his north-eastern frontier and internal rivalries challenging the succession of Khosrow. In c. 520, Kavad, in order to secure the succession of Khosrow, whose position was threatened by rival brothers and the Mazdakite sect, proposed that Emperor Justin I adopt him. The proposal was initially greeted with enthusiasm by the Byzantine Emperor and his nephew, Justinian, but Justin's quaestor, Proclus, opposed the move, due to the concern of Khosrow possibly later try to take over the Byzantine throne. The Byzantines instead made a counter-proposal to adopt Khosrow not as a Roman, but a barbarian. In the end the negotiations did not come to a consensus. Khosrow reportedly felt insulted by the Byzantines, and his attitude towards them deteriorated.

Mahbod, who had along with Siyawush acted as the diplomats of the negotiations, accused the latter of purposely sabotaging the negotiations by mentioning the contested territory of Lazica. Further accusations were made towards Siyawush, which included the reverence of new deities and having his dead wife buried, which was a violation of Iranian laws. Siyawush was thus most likely a Mazdakite, the religious sect that Kavad originally supported but now had withdrawn his support from. According to Dignas and Winter, Kavad's support for the succession of Khosrow, an opponent of Mazdak, suggests a shift in Kavad's attitude towards the Mazdakite movement likely influenced by Khosrow himself. Although Siyawush was a close friend of Kavad and had helped him escape from imprisonment, the latter did not try to prevent his execution, seemingly with the purpose of restricting Siyawush's immense authority as the head of the Sasanian army, a post which was disliked by the other nobles. Siyawush was executed, and his office was abolished. Despite the breakdown of the negotiations, it was not until 530 that full-scale warfare on the main eastern frontier broke out. In the intervening years, the two sides preferred to wage war by proxy, through Arab allies in the south and Huns in the north.

=== Persecution of Mazdak and his followers ===
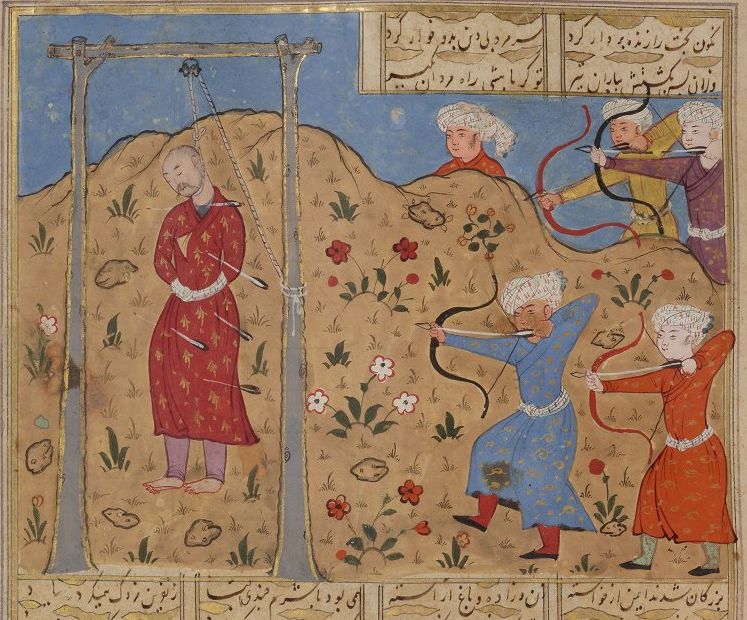
Shahnameh illustration of the death of Mazdak

Mazdak was the chief representative of a religious and philosophical teaching called Mazdakism, which opposed violence, and reportedly called for the sharing of wealth, women and property, an archaic form of communism. Mazdakism not only consisted of theological and cosmological aspects, but also political and social impacts, which was to the disadvantage of the nobility and clergy. According to modern historians Touraj Daryaee and Matthew Canepa, the charge of sharing women was most likely an overstatement and defamation deriving from Mazdak's decree that loosened marriage rules to help the lower classes. Powerful families saw this as a tactic to weaken their lineage and advantages, which was most likely the case. Kavad used the movement as a political tool to curb the power of the nobility and clergy. With the nobility and clergy weakened, Kavad was able to make reforms with less difficulty. By the 520s, Kavad's reforms were progressing smoothly, and he no longer had any use for Mazdak. As a result, he officially withdrew his support from the Mazdakites. A debate was arranged where not only the Zoroastrian priesthood, but also the Christian and Jewish ones slandered Mazdak and his followers.

According to the Shahnameh, Kavad had Mazdak and his supporters sent to Khosrow, who had his supporters killed by burying their heads in a walled orchard, with only their feet being visible. Khosrow then summoned Mazdak to look at his garden, saying the following: "You will find trees there that no-one has ever seen and no-one ever heard of even from the mouth of the ancient sages." Mazdak, seeing his followers corpses, screamed and passed out. He was afterwards executed by Khosrow, who had his feet fastened on a gallows, and had his men shoot arrows at him. The validity of the story is uncertain; Ferdowsi used much earlier reports of events to write the Shahnameh, and thus the story may report some form of contemporary memory.

== Accession ==
=== The Eternal Peace of 532 ===
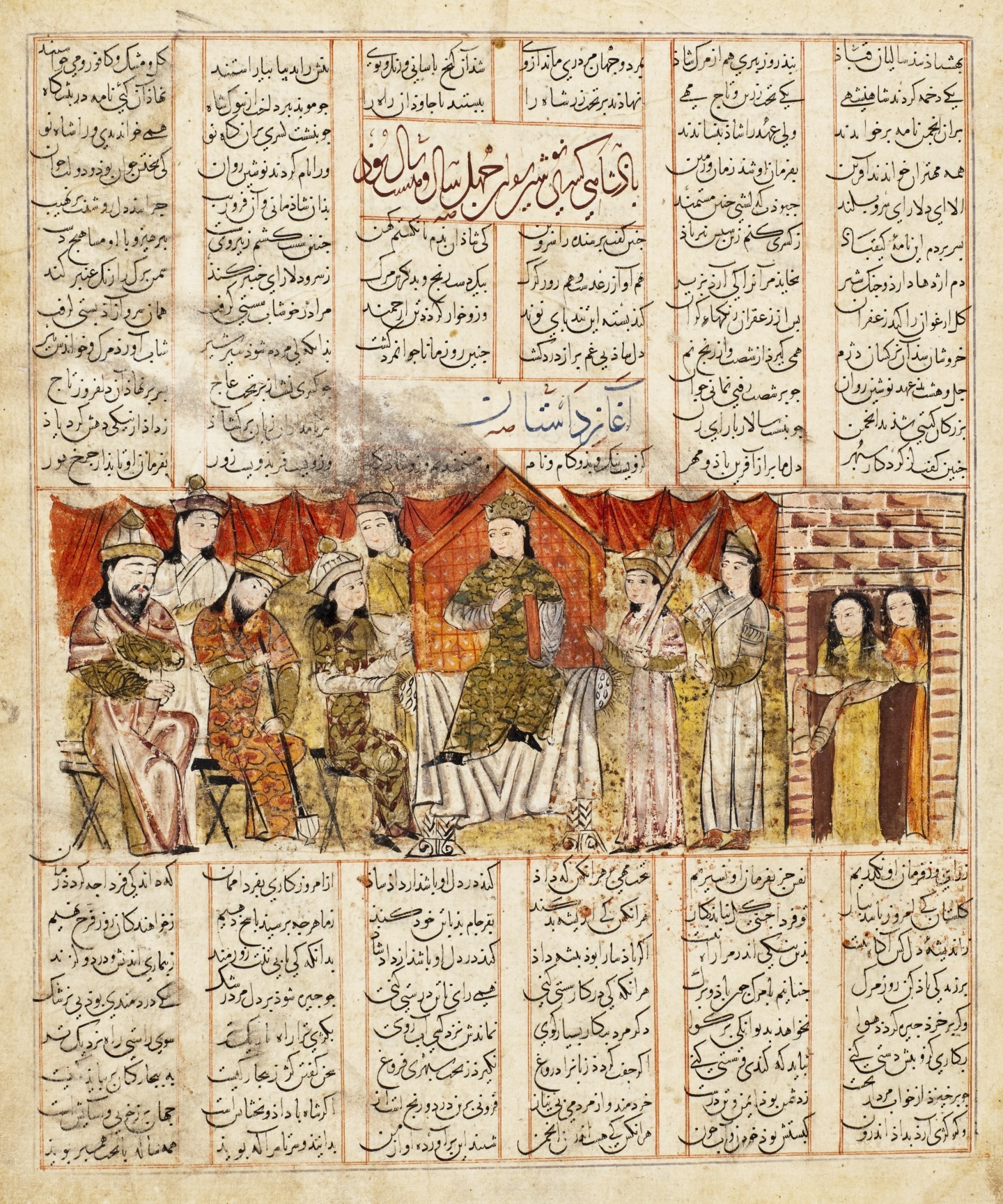
14th-century Shahnameh illustration of Khosrow I seated on his throne

In 531, while the Iranian army was besieging Martyropolis, Kavad became ill and died. Khosrow succeeded him, but due to his domestic position being insecure, he wanted to make peace with the Byzantines, who themselves under Emperor Justinian I (r. 527–565) were perhaps already more focused on recovering the lost western half of the Roman Empire than on pursuing war against Iran. The Byzantine envoys Rufinus, Hermogenes, Alexander and Thomas found Khosrow in a more conciliatory disposition than his father, and an agreement was soon reached. Justinian would pay 110 centenaria (11,000 pounds) of gold, ostensibly as a contribution to the defence of the Caucasus passes against the barbarians living beyond, and the base of the dux Mesopotamiae would be withdrawn from the fortress of Dara to the city of Constantina. The two rulers would recognize once again each other as equal and pledged mutual assistance. Khosrow initially refused to hand back the two Lazic forts, while demanding the return of the two other forts the Byzantines had captured in Sasanian Armenia. Justinian at first agreed, but soon changed his mind, causing the agreement to be broken off. In summer 532, however, a new embassy by Hermogenes and Rufinus managed to persuade Khosrow for a full exchange of the occupied forts, as well as for allowing the exiled Iberian rebels to either remain in the Byzantine Empire or return safely to their homes.

=== Consolidation of power ===
Sometime during the early reign of Khosrow, he had to deal with his eldest brother Kawus, who ruled as governor-king of the northern province of Padishkhwargar. Unlike Khosrow, he was a Mazdakite (or at least had strong Mazdakite sympathies) and thus had their support as the candidate for the throne. Kawus asserted that he was the legitimate heir to the throne due to his older age. He was, however, defeated by Khosrow's forces and taken to Ctesiphon, where Khosrow summoned the priests and urged Kawus to make confessions and ask for forgiveness so that he could be released. Kawus refused, preferring death, forcing Khosrow to have him killed. Khosrow reportedly "cursed the fortunes" for "forcing him to kill a brother like Kawus."

Another danger to Khosrow's rule was that of his uncle Bawi, who, along with other members of the Iranian aristocracy, became involved in a conspiracy to overthrow Khosrow and make Kavad, the son of Khosrow's brother Jamasp, the shah of Iran. Upon learning of the plot, Khosrow executed all his brothers and their offspring, along with Bawi and the other aristocrats who were involved. Khosrow also ordered the execution of Kavad, who was still a child and was away from the court, being raised by Adergoudounbades. Adergoudounbades disobeyed Khosrow's orders to kill Kavad and brought him up in secret, until he was betrayed to the shah in 541 by his own son, Bahram. Khosrow had him executed, but Kavad, or someone claiming to be him, managed to flee to the Byzantine Empire.

== Reforms ==
=== Summary ===
Khosrow I represents the epitome of the philosopher king in the Sasanian Empire. Upon his ascent to the throne, Khosrow did not restore power to the feudal nobility or the magi, but centralized his government. Khosrow's reign is considered to be one of the most successful within the Sasanian Empire. The peace agreement between Rome and Iran in 531 gave Khosrow the chance to consolidate power and focus his attention on internal improvement. His reforms and military campaigns marked a renaissance of the Sasanian Empire, which spread philosophic beliefs as well as trade goods from the far east to the far west.

The internal reforms under Khosrow were much more important than those on the exterior frontier. The subsequent reforms resulted in the rise of a bureaucratic state at the expense of the great noble families, strengthening the central government and the power of the Shahanshah. The army too was reorganized and tied to the central government rather than local nobility allowing greater organization, faster mobilization and a far greater cavalry corps. Reforms in taxation provided the empire with stability and a much stronger economy, allowing prolonged military campaigns as well as greater revenues for the bureaucracy.

=== Tax reforms ===
Khosrow's tax reforms have been praised by several scholars, the most notable of whom is F. Altheim. The tax reforms, which were started under Kavad I and completely implemented by Khosrow, greatly strengthened the royal court. Prior to Khosrow and Kavad's reigns, a majority of the land was owned by seven Parthian families: Suren, Waraz, Karen, Ispahbudhan, Spandiyadh, Mihran and Zik. These great landowners enjoyed tax exemptions from the Sasanian empire, and were tax collectors within their local provincial areas.

With the outbreak of the Mazdakite revolution, there was a great uprising of peasants and lower-class citizens who grabbed large portions of land under egalitarian values. As a result of this there was great confusion on land possession and ownership. Khosrow surveyed all the land within the empire indiscriminately and began to tax all land under a single program. Under the new regulations, all persons between the ages of 20 and 50, except nobles, soldiers and priests, were compelled to pay the poll tax, whose amount ranged from 12 drachms (Arabic dirhams) to 4 drachms, according to wealth. Tax revenues that previously went to the local noble family now went to the central government treasury. The fixed tax that Khosrow implemented created a more stable form of income for the treasury.

Because the tax did not vary, the treasury could easily estimate the year's revenue. Prior to Khosrow's tax reforms, taxes were collected based on the yield that the land had produced. The new system calculated and averaged taxation based on the water rights for each piece of property. Lands which grew date palms and olive trees used a slightly different method of taxation based on the amount of producing trees that the land contained. These tax reforms of Khosrow marked a turning point in the Sasanian state administration and enabled subsequent reforms in the bureaucracy and the military to take place.

A comparative study of the Sasanian economy relative to those of the Abbasid Caliphate, Byzantine Empire, and Han Empire suggests the Sasanian government after the reforms of Khosrow I had 3 to 6 times higher income, although the government was levying less taxes relative to later non-Iranian governments of Persia.

=== Administrative reforms ===
The hallmark of Khosrow's bureaucratic reform was the creation of a new social class. Before, the Sasanian Empire consisted of only three social classes, magi, nobles and peasants/commoners. Khosrow added a fourth class to this hierarchy between the nobles and the peasants, called the dehqans. The dehqans were small landowning citizens of the Sasanian Empire and were considered lower nobility.

Khosrow promoted honest government officials based on trust and honesty, rather than corrupt nobles and magi. The small landowning dehqans were favored over the high-ranking nobles because they tended to be more trustworthy and owed their loyalty to the Shah for their position in the bureaucracy. The rise of the dehqans became the backbone of the empire because they now held the majority of land and positions in local and provincial administration.

The reduction of power of the great families improved the empire. This was because previously, each great family ruled a large chunk of land and had their own king. The name Shahanshah, meaning King of Kings, derived from the fact that there were many feudal kings in Sasanian Iran with the Shahanshah as the ruler of them all. Their fall meant their power was redirected to the central government and all taxes now went to the central government rather than to the local nobility.

=== Military reforms ===
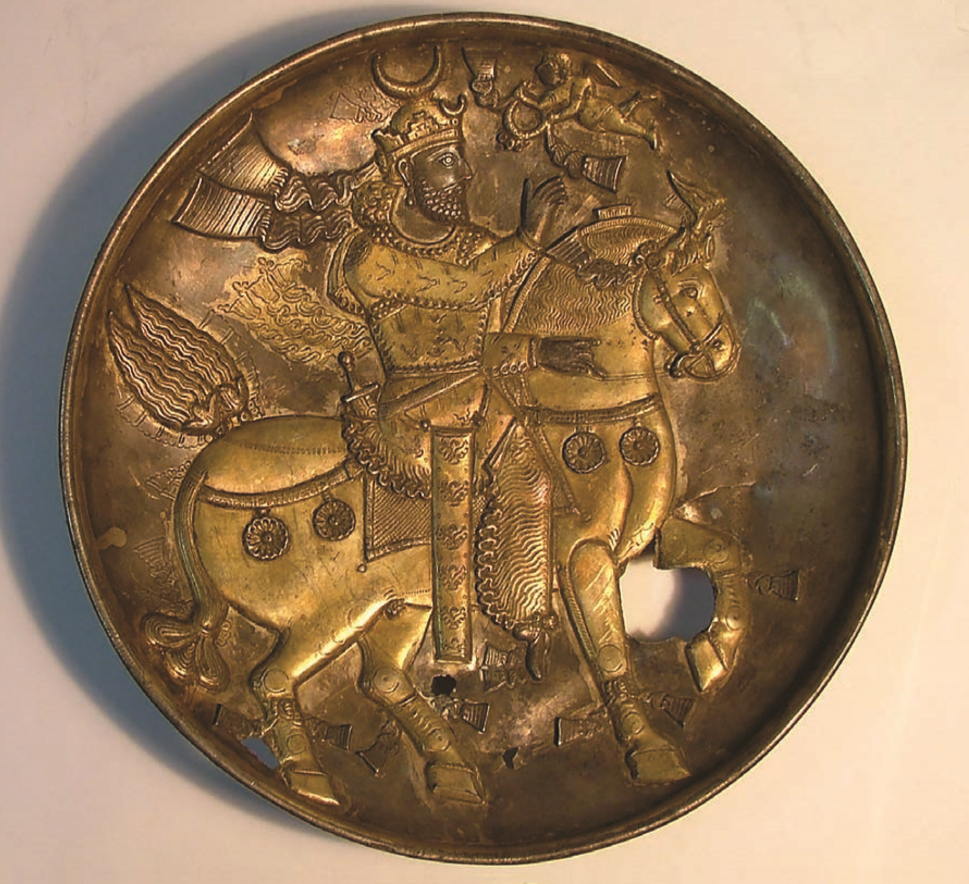
Plate of Khosrow on horseback

Major reforms to the military made the Iranian army capable of fighting sustained wars, battling on multiple fronts, and deploy itself faster. Prior to Khosrow's reign, much like other aspects of the empire, the military was dependent on the feudal lords of the great families to provide soldiers and cavalry. Each family would provide their own army and equipment when called by the Shahanshah. This system was replaced with the emergence of the lower dehqan nobility class, who was paid and provided by the central government.

The main force of the Sasanian army was the cavalry, or aswaran. Previously only nobles could enlist in the aswaran, which created shortages in well-trained soldiers. Now that the dehqan class was considered nobility, they were able to join the cavalry force and boosted its number significantly.

The military reform focused more on organization and training of troops. The cavalry was still the most important aspect of the Iranian military, with foot archers being less important, and mass peasant forces being at the bottom of the spectrum.

The command structure of the army was also changed under Khosrow. He made four military districts with a spahbed, or general, in charge of each district. Before the reforms of Khosrow, the general of the Iranians (Eran-spahbed) controlled the military of the entire empire. The four zones consisted of Mesopotamia in the west, the Caucasus region in the north, the Persian Gulf in the central and southwest region, and Central Asia in the east. This new quadripartition of the Empire not only created a more efficient military system but also "[administration] of a vast, multiregional, multicultural, and multiracial empire".

==== Equipment ====
During Khosrow's reign, a "list" for equipment for the cavalry (aswaran) was written. The list comprised a helmet, a gorget, a chain mail shirt, a lamellar coat or cuirass, leg armour, gauntlets, sword, shield, two bows with spare strings, 30 arrows, axe or mace, and horse armour.

Sasanian bullae showing the four spahbeds show that horses were still fully armoured during this period and heavy cavalry tactics were still used by the Sasanian cavalry. It is highly likely that the stirrup had been introduced to the Sasanian cavalry two centuries before Khosrow's reforms (and are mentioned in Bivar (1972)), and a "stirruped" foot position can be seen on the Sasanian bullae and at Taq-e-Bostan.

== Military campaigns ==
=== War with the Byzantine Empire, 540–562 ===
Map of the Byzantine–Sasanian frontier

==== Background ====
In 539 Khosrow had originally attempted to gain a casus belli against the Byzantines by trying to take advantage of a disagreement between his Lakhmid clients and the Byzantine clients Ghassanids, who both claimed ownership of the lands south of Palmyra, near the old Strata Diocletiana. His attempt was, however, thwarted when the Byzantines successfully equivocated the problem. Subsequently, Khosrow accused Justinian of trying to bribe the Lakhmid ruler al-Mundhir III ibn al-Nu'man (r. 503–554) through his diplomat Summus, and also that he had emboldened some Huns to make incursions into Iran. The Ghassanid ruler al-Harith ibn Jabalah (r. 528–569) invaded Mundhir's territory and carried off rich booty. Khosrow complained to Justinian about this incident, and requested that the stolen riches be returned to him, including payment for the Arabs that had been killed during the attack. His request was, however, ignored. This incident, along with the support by an emissary from the Ostrogoth king Vitiges, and the Armenians living in Byzantine territory being dissatisfied with their rule, encouraged Khosrow to renew the war against the Byzantines. Justinian's ceaseless wars in North Africa and Italy must have contributed to Khosrow's aspirations as well. Justinian, informed of Khosrow's intention for war, tried to dissuade him, but to no avail.

==== Sasanian invasion of Syria ====
In May 540, Khosrow invaded the domains of the Byzantines; he avoided the fortress of Circesium, and instead approached Zenobia, where he made a lukewarm attempt to persuade the fortress to surrender, which proved unsuccessful. He then proceeded to Sura and killed its commander Arsaces in battle. Demoralized by the death of their commander, the residents sent their bishop to parley with Khosrow. Feigning to accept the plea of the bishop, Khosrow took advantage of the occasion and captured the city, which was shortly sacked. Germanus, the cousin of Justinian, sent the bishop of Beroea, Megas, to negotiate with Khosrow. Regardless, Khosrow continued his expedition, threatening the city of Hierapolis, whose custodians swiftly paid him 2,000 pounds or 910 kilograms of silver to leave the city untouched. After receiving additional pleas by Megas, Khosrow agreed to end his expedition in return for ten centenaria. While Megas went back to Antioch to inform Germanus of Khosrow's demands, the latter approached Beroea, which he had sacked. In June, Khosrow reached Antioch, where he offered its citizens to not attack the city in return for ten centenaria. His offer was rejected, and as a result he captured and sacked the city.

Justinian sued for peace, and made a treaty with Khosrow that the Iranians would withdraw back to their domains in return for a payment of 50 centenaria plus 5 centenaria extra each year. Part of treaty also included that the Byzantine envoys were to be hostages of Khosrow as an assurance that the Byzantines would honor the agreement. However, before departing, Khosrow went to the port of Antioch, Seleucia Pieria, where he bathed in the Mediterranean Sea. He then told the envoys that he wished to visit the city of Apamea out of interest, which they reluctantly allowed him, with the condition that he would leave for his domains afterwards. There he held chariot races, where he made the Blue Faction—which was supported by Justinian—lose against the rival Greens. Khosrow extracted tribute from Apamea and other Byzantine towns, at which point Justinian called off his truce and prepared to send his commander Belisarius to move against the Sasanians.

==== Lazic War ====
Map of Lazica

In spring 541, Khosrow brought his army north to Lazica on request of the Lazic king Gubazes II to repel the Byzantines from his territory. The fortress of Petra was afterwards captured by Khosrow's forces, and a protectorate was established over the country. At the same time, Belisarius arrived in Mesopotamia and began besieging the city of Nisibis. Although Belisarius had greatly outnumbered the city garrison, the city was too well fortified and he was forced to ravage the country around the Nisibis, subsequently getting recalled back west. After successful campaigns in Armenia, Khosrow was encouraged once again to attack Syria. Khosrow turned south towards Edessa and besieged the city. Edessa was now a much more important city than Antioch was, and the garrison which occupied the city was able to resist the siege. The Iranians were forced to retreat from Edessa, but were able to forge a five-year truce with the Byzantine Empire in 545. During the negotiations for the peace treaty, Khosrow requested both financial compensation and that the Roman physician Tribunus be sent to live with him for a year. Justinian agreed to both demands. Three years into the five-year truce (548), rebellion against Sasanian control broke out in Lazica. In response, a Byzantine army was sent to support the people of Lazica, effectively ending the established truce and thus continuing the Lazic Wars.

Sometime later, Khosrow, who was keen to wrest Dara from Byzantine control, and would do so even if he risked to break the truce they had made regarding Mesopotamia, tried to capture it by tricking them; he sent one of highest officials, Izadgushasp, as a diplomat to Constantinople, but in reality the latter would stop by Dara, and with the aid of his large crew, he would seize the city. However, this plan was prevented by a former adviser of Belisarius named George, who demanded that if Izadgushasp should enter the city he should have only twenty members of his crew with him. Izadgushasp then left the city and continued his journey to Constantinople, where he was amicably welcomed by Justinian, who gave him some gifts.

In 549 the previous truce between Justinian and Khosrow was disregarded and full war broke out once again between Iranians and Romans. The last major decisive battle of the Lazic wars came in 556 when Byzantine general Martin defeated a massive Sasanian force led by an Iranian nakhvaegan (field marshal). Negotiations between Khosrow and Justinian opened in 556, leading to the Fifty-Year Peace Treaty in 562 in which Iranians would leave Lazica in return for an annual payment of gold.

According to ancient historian Menander Protector, a minor official in Justinian's court, there were 12 points to the treaty, stated in the following passage:

1. Through the pass at the place called Tzon and through the Caspian Gates the

Persians shall not allow the Huns or Alans or other barbarians access to the Roman Empire, nor shall the Romans either in that area or on any other part of the Persian frontier send an army against the Persians.

2. The Saracen allies of both states shall themselves also abide by these agreements and those of the Persians shall not attack the Romans, nor those of the Romans the Persians.

3. Roman and Persian merchants of all kinds of goods, as well as similar tradesmen, shall conduct their business according to the established practice through the specified customs posts.

4. Ambassadors and all others using the public post to deliver messages, both those traveling to Roman and those to Persian territory, shall be honoured each according to his status and rank and shall receive the appropriate attention. They shall be sent back without delay, but shall be able to exchange the trade goods which they have brought without hindrance or any impost.

5. It is agreed that Saracen and all other barbarian merchants of either state shall not travel by strange roads but shall go by Nisibis and Daras, and shall not cross into foreign territory without official permission. But if they dare anything contrary to the agreement (that is to say, if they engage in tax-dodging, so-called), they shall be hunted down by the officers of the frontier and handed over for punishment together with the merchandise which they are carrying, whether Assyrian or Roman.

6. If anyone during the period of hostilities defected either from the Romans to the Persians or from the Persians to the Romans and if he should give himself up and wish to return to his home, he shall not be prevented from so doing and no obstacle shall be put in his way. But those who in time of peace defect and desert from one side to the other shall not be received, but every means shall be used to return them, even against their will, to those from whom they fled.

7. Those who complain that they have suffered some hurt at the hands of subjects of the other state shall settle the dispute equitably, meeting at the border either in person or through their own representatives before the officials of both states, and in this manner the guilty party shall make good the damage.

8. Henceforth, the Persians shall not complain to the Romans about the fortification of Daras. But in future neither state shall fortify or protect with a wall any place along the frontier, so that no occasion for dispute shall arise from such an act and the treaty be broken.

9. The forces of one state shall not attack or make war upon a people or any other territory subject to the other, but without inflicting or suffering injury shall remain where they are so that they too might enjoy the peace.

10. A large force, beyond what is adequate to defend the town, shall not be stationed at Daras, and the general of the East shall not have his headquarters there, in order that this not lead to incursions against or injury to the Persians. It was agreed that if some such should happen, the commander at Daras should deal with the offense.

11. If a city causes damage to or destroys the property of a city of the other side not in legitimate hostilities and with a regular military force but by guile and theft (for there are such godless men who do these things to provide a pretext for war), it was agreed that the judges stationed on the frontiers of both states should make a thorough investigation of such acts and punish them. If these prove unable to check the damage that neighbours are inflicting on each other, it was agreed that the case should be referred to the general of the East on the understanding that if the dispute were not settled within six months and the plaintiff had not recovered his losses, the offender should be liable to the plaintiff for a double indemnity. It was agreed that if the matter were not settled in this way, the injured party should send a deputation to the sovereign of the offender. If within one year the sovereign does not give satisfaction and the plaintiff does not receive the double indemnity due to him, the treaty shall be regarded as broken in respect of this clause.

12. Here you might find prayers to God and imprecations to the effect that may God be gracious and ever an ally to him who abides by the peace, but if anyone with deceit wishes to alter any of the agreements, may God be his adversary and enemy.

13. The treaty is for fifty years, and the terms of the peace shall be in force for fifty years, the year being reckoned according to the old fashion as ending with the three hundred and sixty-fifth day.

=== War in the East ===
Sasanian expansion in the east

With a stable peace agreement with the Byzantines in the west, Khosrow was now able to focus his attention on the eastern Hephthalites and end their domination over Central Asia. Even with the growth of Iranian military power under Khosrow's reforms, the Sasanians were still uneasy at the prospect of attacking the Hephthalite on their own and began to seek allies. Their answer came in the form of Turkic incursions into Central Asia. The movement of Turkic people into Central Asia very quickly made them natural enemies and competitors to the Hephthalites.

The Hephthalites were a strong military power but they lacked the organization to fight on multiple fronts. The Sasanians and the First Turkic Khaganate made an alliance and in 557 launched a two pronged attack on the Hephthalites, taking advantage of their disorganization and disunity. The Hephthalite Empire was destroyed after the battle of Gol-Zarriun, and broke into several minor kingdoms around the Oxus. The Hephthalite king Ghadfar and what was left of his men fled southward to Sasanian territory, where they took refuge. Meanwhile, the Turkic Khagan Sinjibu reached an agreement with the Hephthalite nobility, and appointed Faghanish, the ruler of Chaghaniyan, as the new Hephthalite king.

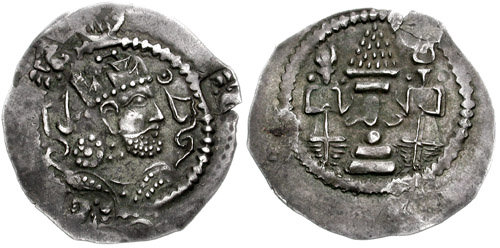
Later imitation of a drachm of Khosrow I from the Surkhan Darya valley, Tokharistan, a region that was lost during the reign of Peroz I, but was later reconquered by Khosrow I

This was much to the dislike of Khosrow, who considered the Turkic collaboration with the Hephthalites to pose a danger for his rule in the east, and thus marched towards the Sasanian-Turkic border in Gurgan. When he reached the place, he was met by a Turkic delegate of Sinjibu that presented him gifts. There Khosrow asserted his authority and military potency, and persuaded the Turks to make an alliance with him. The alliance contained a treaty that made it obligatory for Faghanish to be sent to the Sasanian court in Ctesiphon and gain the approval of Khosrow for his status as Hephthalite king. Faghanish and his kingdom of Chaghaniyan thus became a vassal of the Sasanian Empire, which set the Oxus as the eastern frontier the Sasanians and Turks. However, friendly relations between Turks and Sasanians quickly deteriorated after that. Both Turks and Iranians wanted to dominate the Silk Road and the trade industry between the west and the far east. In 562 Khosrow I defeated the Hephthalites once again, and then stopped the threat of the Turks.

In 568 a Turkic embassy was sent to Byzantine to propose an alliance and two pronged attack on the Sasanian Empire. Fortunately for the Sasanians, nothing ever came from this proposal. Later in 569/570, Sinjibu attacked and pillaged Sasanian border lands, but a treaty was soon signed. Khosrow then sent a Mihranid named Mihransitad, to estimate the quality of the daughter of the Turkic Khagan. According to Armenian sources her name was Kayen, while Persian sources states that her name was Qaqim-khaqan. After Mihransitad's visit in Central Asia, Khosrow married Qaqim-khaqan. According to some sources, Hormizd IV, the successor of Khosrow, was the son of the Turkic princess. However, Encyclopædia Iranica states that the "marriage with the daughter of the Turkic khaqan is chronologically impossible", and says that Hormizd was born in 540, thirty years before Khosrow's marriage.

=== Campaign in Yemen against Abyssinia ===
In 522, before Khosrow's reign, a group of miaphysite Ethiopians led an attack on the dominant Himyarites of southern Arabia. The local Arab leader blunted the attack, and appealed to the Sasanians for aid, while the Ethiopians subsequently turned towards the Byzantines for help. The Ethiopians sent another force across the Red Sea, killed the Arab leader, and crowned an Ethiopian king of the region.

In 531, Justinian suggested that the Ethiopians of Yemen end the Sasanians maritime trade with the Indians. The Ethiopians never met this request because an Ethiopian general named Abraha took control of the Yemenite throne and created an independent nation. After Abraha's death one of his sons, Ma'd-Karib, went into exile while his half-brother took the throne. After being denied by Justinian, Ma'd-Karib sought help from Khosrow, who sent a small fleet and army under commander Vahrez to depose the current king of Yemen. After capturing the capital city San'a'l, Ma'd-Karib's son, Saif enthroned.

Justinian was ultimately responsible for Sasanian maritime presence in Yemen. By not providing the Yemenite Arabs support, Khosrow was able to help Ma'd-Karib and subsequently established Yemen as a principality of the Sasanian Empire.

=== War with the Byzantine Empire, 572–591 ===
Justinian died in 565 and left Justin II to succeed the throne. In 555, the Sasanian governor of Armenia and a relative of Khosrow, Chihor-Vishnasp (also known as Suren), built a fire temple at the Armenian capital Dvin and put to death a popular and influential member of the Mamikonian family. This execution created tremendous civil unrest and led to a revolt and massacre of the governor including the capture of Dvin in 572. Justin II took advantage of this revolt and used it as an excuse to stop paying annual payments to Khosrow, effectively putting an end to the 51 year peace treaty that was established ten years earlier. Khosrow, who tried to avoid another war, sent a Christian diplomat named Sebokht to Constantinople in order to try to persuade Justin to change his mind. Justin, however, refused to listen to the diplomat, and prepared to help the Armenians, whom he considered his allies, in their war against Khosrow. A Byzantine army was sent into Sasanian territory and besieged Nisibis in the same year.

Meanwhile, Khosrow sent an army under Golon Mihran to Armenia, but the latter was defeated in Taron by the Armenian rebel leader Vardan III Mamikonian, who captured his war elephants as war booty. Sometime later, however, Golon Mihran managed to seize Angl. During the same time, the Siunian prince Vahan asked for Khosrow's permission that he could move his court from Dvin to the capital of Paytakaran, a region in eastern Armenia. Furthermore, Vahan also requested that Paytakaran should be merged with the Adurbadagan province. Khosrow accepted, and did what he asked.

In 573, Khosrow sent an army under Adarmahan to invade Syria, while he himself along with the three Mihranid military officers Izadgushasp, Fariburz and Bahram Chobin led an army towards Dara, where they captured the city after four months, while Adarmahan sacked several cities in Syria, which included Apamea. Justin reportedly lost his mind after these Byzantine disasters, and abdicated.

Justin II was succeeded by Tiberius, a high-ranking military officer in 578. Khosrow invaded Armenia once again feeling that he had the upper hand, and was initially successful. Soon after, the tables turned and the Byzantines gained a lot of local support. This made the Sasanians attempt another truce. However, sometime later, Khosrow, with an army consisting of 12,000 Iranian soldiers including a combined of Sabir-Arab soldiers numbering 8,000 sent by his allies, ravaged the places around Resaina and Constantia in Syria, thus turning the tables once more. During the same time, one of Khosrow's chief generals, Tamkhosrau, managed to trick Maurice by faking an invasion of Theodosiopolis, and then plundered the countryside of Martyropolis and Amida.

However, the tables of the war quickly turned again when the newly appointed Byzantine supreme-commander Maurice initiated a series of Campaigns and captured many Sasanian settlements. The revolt came to an end when Khosrow gave amnesty to Armenia and brought them back into the Sasanian empire. Peace negotiations were once again brought back up, but abruptly ended with the death of Khosrow in 579, who was succeeded by his son Hormizd IV.

== Religious policy ==
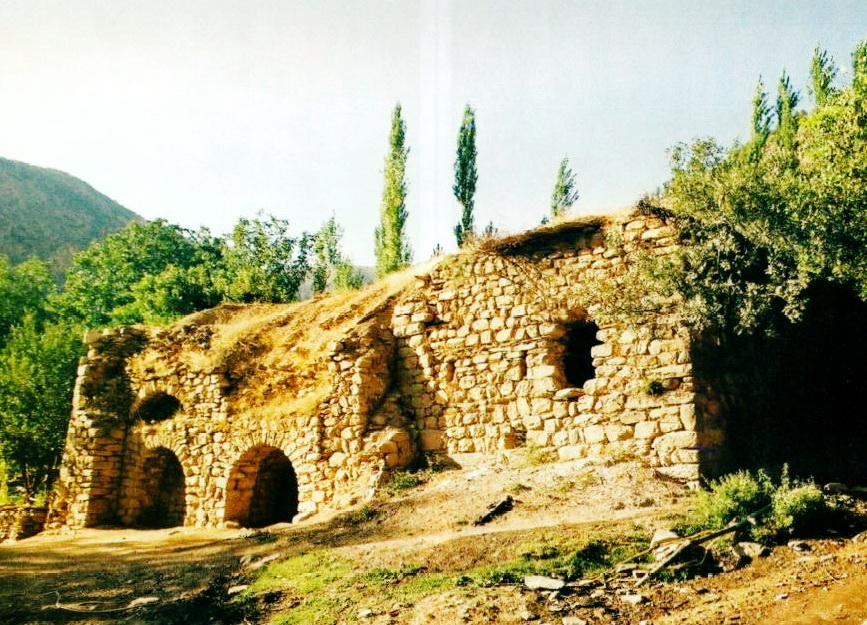
The remains of a 6th-century Nestorian church in Geramon

Khosrow, like all other Sasanian rulers, was an adherent of Zoroastrianism. According to tradition the Zoroastrian Avestan texts were written down during his reign. This first written version of the Avesta is referred to as the Sasanian Avesta.

Since the 5th century, the Sasanian monarchs had been made aware of the significance of the religious minorities in the realm, and as a result tried to homogenize them into a structure of administration where according to legal principles, all would be treated straightforwardly as mard / zan ī šahr, i.e. "man/woman citizen (of the Empire)." Jews and notably Christians had accepted the concept of Iran and considered themselves part of the nation. By the time of Khosrow, the leader of the Church of the East had the title of "Catholicos of Iran" (Ērān Cathollicos).

Sasanian monarchs only persecuted other religions when it was in their urgent political interests to do. This also applied to Khosrow, who, in the words of Eberhard Sauer, had to "walk a fine line". Khosrow himself used the church considerably, and was fond of its Patriarch, Aba I, whom he wanted to defend against the Zoroastrian priests. Nevertheless, Aba was accused of working with the Byzantines, which was a serious allegation due to the war that had begun in 540. Consequently, in 542, Aba was dismissed from his post, but was only exiled instead of being executed.

Khosrow even enjoyed good relations with Gregory, the Mihranid commander of the Iranian troops in the Caucasus, who had showily disowned Zoroastrianism in front of other troops massed at a feast in 518. This resulted in discontent amongst members of the court, who pressured Khosrow to deal with an apostate from such a powerful and influential family, stating that "It is a great dishonor for the religion of the Magians that such a great man from the lineage of the house of Mihran, who have always been servants of Ohrmazd, now becomes a servant of Christ." Khosrow was thus forced to have Gregory relieved and incarcerated, yet the Mihranids deemed Khosrow's choice insufficient. A son of Gregory's paternal uncle, Mihran, asked Khosrow to execute Gregory for "bringing dishonor to our lineage". The latter was in a good position to make such request, due to recently having defeated the Hephthalites in the east; Gregory was eventually executed.

Khosrow did however deal harshly and swiftly with people with of any belief or practice that ran contrary to Sasanian-mediated Zoroastrian orthodoxy. Aberrance in ceremony and principle exceeded apostasy as "a social and political evil in undermining the foundations of the imperial religion (Payne)." According to Khosrow's supposed autobiographical work of Sirat Anushirwan, he had a party of nobles practicing unorthodoxy executed instantly when he found out about them. According to the book, Khosrow also had another group−supposedly Manichaeans−banished from Iran. This was due to the royal anxieties regarding the chance of religious rogues to upset the political structure, which had recently occurred during Kavad and Khosrow's reigns by the Mazdakites.

== Constructions ==
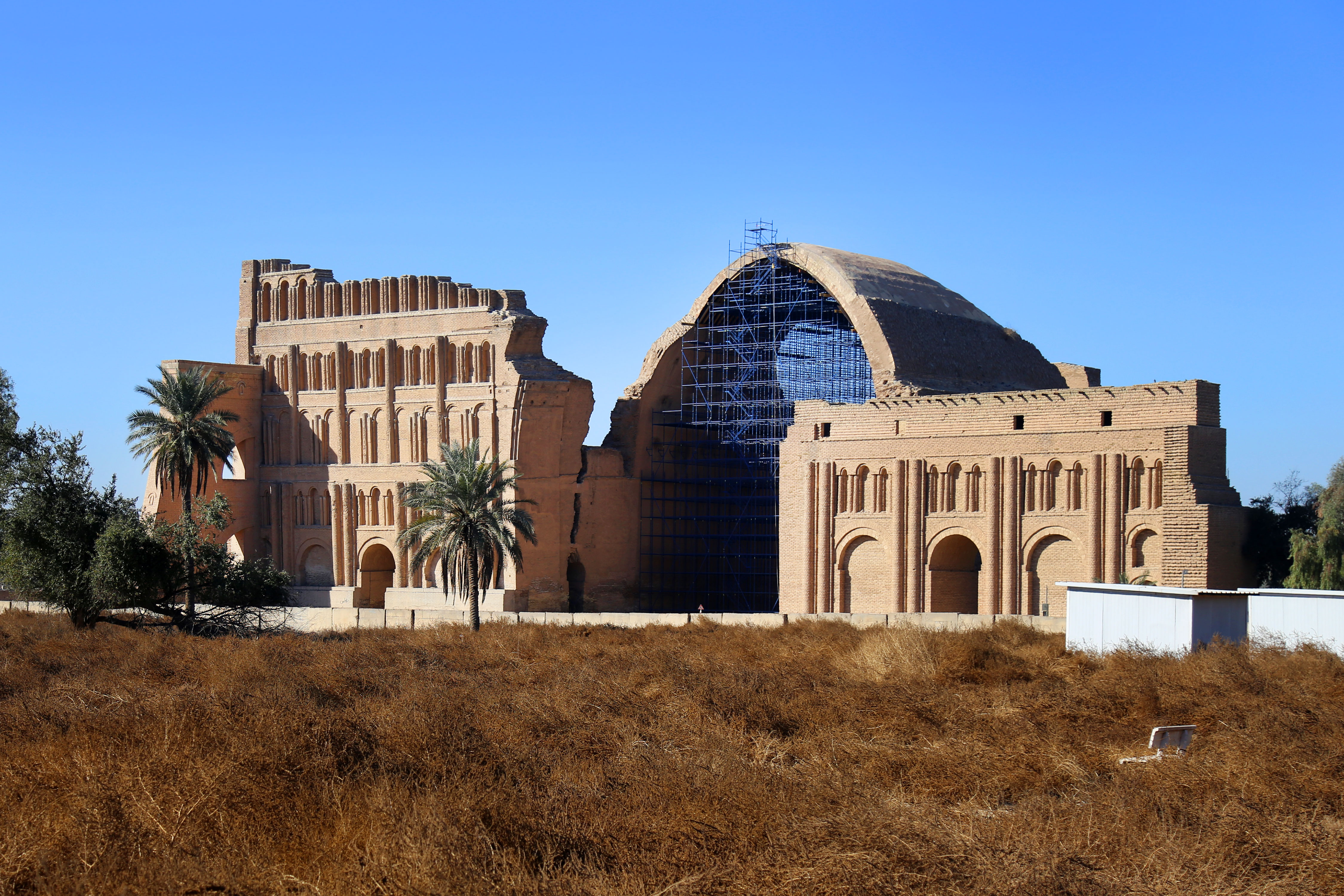
The ruins of the Taq-e Kasra today

Khosrow is known to have ordered many public works projects during his long reign, such bridges, roads, dams and walls. To protect the frontiers of Iran, Khosrow had a sequence of walls built (and fortified) around his empire, much like the Great Wall of China and Hadrian's Wall in Northern England. Instead of constructing it on one side of the empire, he had it on four. According to Middle Persian sources, Khosrow I ordered the construction of the Great Wall of Gorgan, which extended from the eastern coast of the Caspian Sea to block incursions by nomadic tribes, such as the Hephthalites. In the northwest, he had the Derbent Wall further fortified to protect the area from incursions by Alans, Turks, Sarirs, Khazars, and other northern neighbours.

Another wall was constructed in the southwest, called the war-i tāzigān ("wall of the Arabs"). He may have also built another wall in the northeast−the Wall of Tammisha. Besides defense structures, Khosrow also had a large-scale canal system created in Asoristan, known in Islamic sources as the Nahrawan Canal. Out of all his constructions, his most memorable and noteworthy achievement was the palace he had made at Ctesiphon, known as the Taq-e Kasra. The palace, still standing to this day, albeit heavily ruined, portrays one of the empire's most remarkable architectural accomplishments.

After the sack of Antioch in 540, Khosrow built a new city one parasang (4–5 kilometres or 2.5–3.1 miles) south of Ctesiphon for the inhabitants he had captured. It was located on the eastern bank of the Tigris, and was officially named Weh-andīōg-husraw ("City Better than Antioch [has] Khosrow [built this]" or "Khosrow's Better Antioch"). The city reportedly had public baths and a hippodrome, and a street program modelled on Antioch. The Christian population was granted freedom of religion and burial. The city was known informally as Rumagan ("Town of the Greeks"), which later became ar-Rumiyya under the Caliphate. The remains of the city are most likely situated at the unexcavated place that is still known as Bustan Kisra ("Gardens of Khosrow").

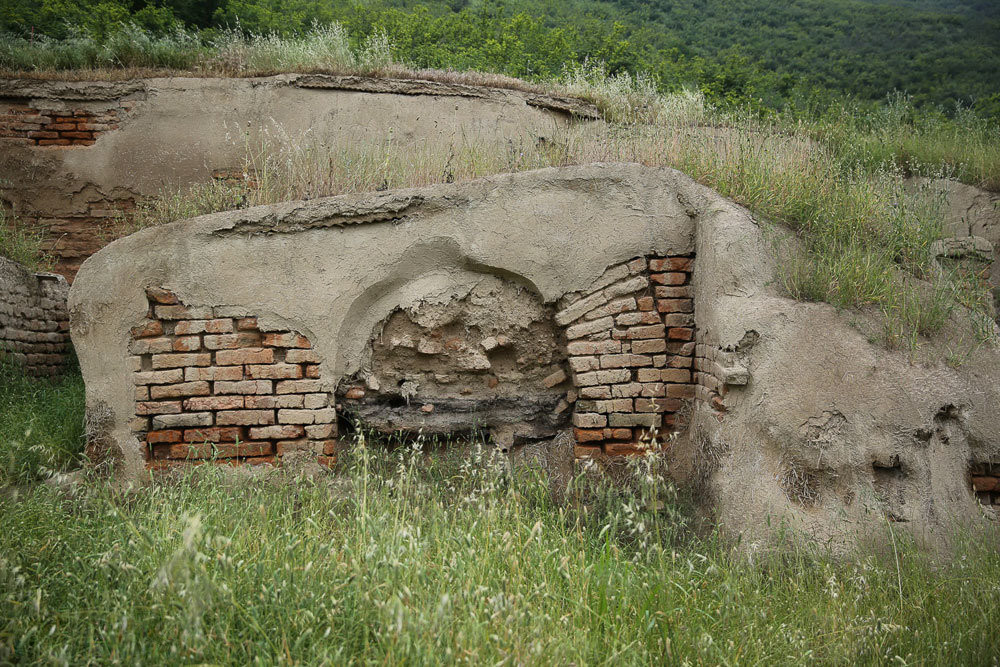
Remains of the Great Wall of Gorgan

Map illustrating the extent of the Great Wall of Gorgan

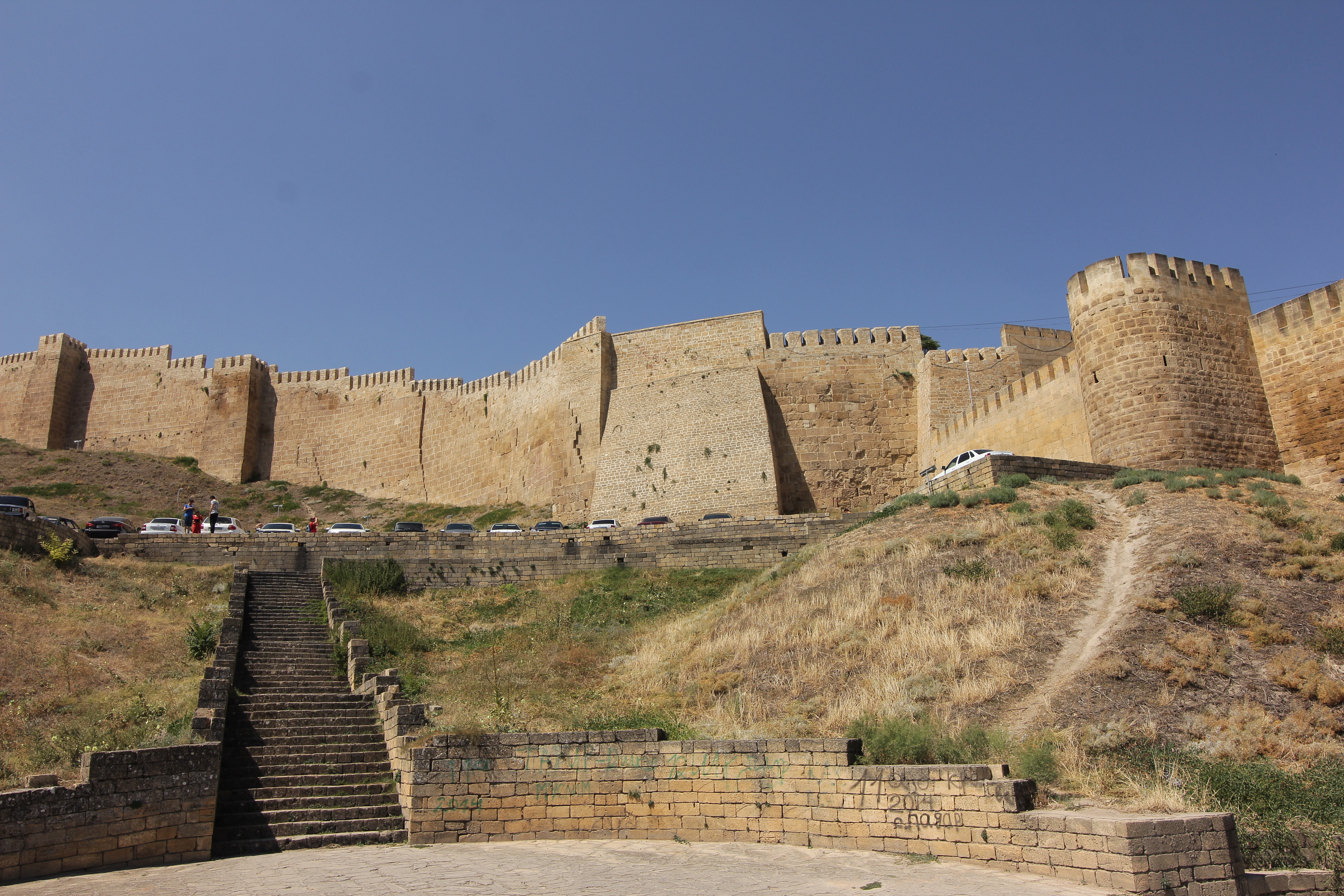
Wall of the Derbent citadel

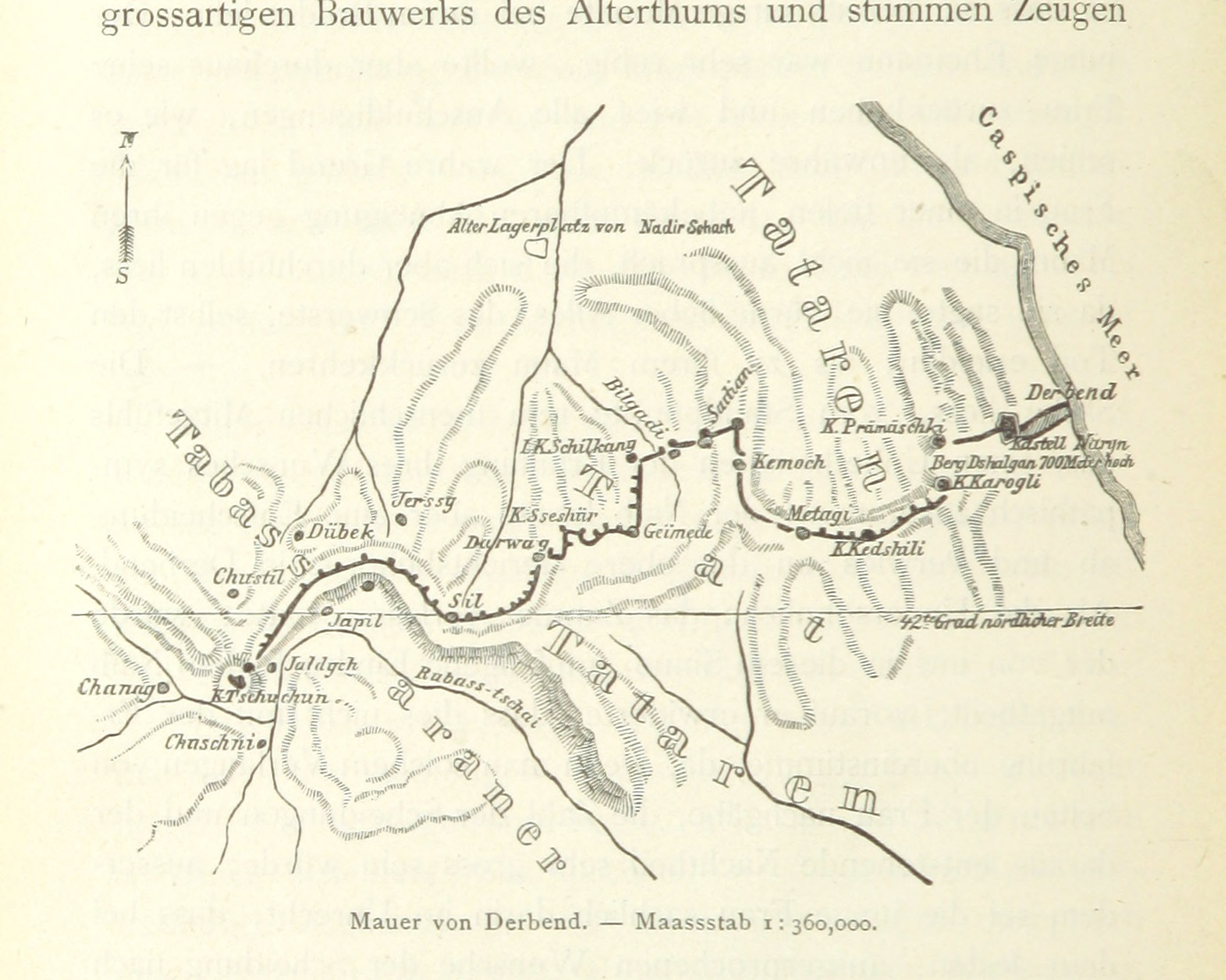
Map of the Sasanian fortifications at Derbent, by Roderich von Erckert

== Coinage ==
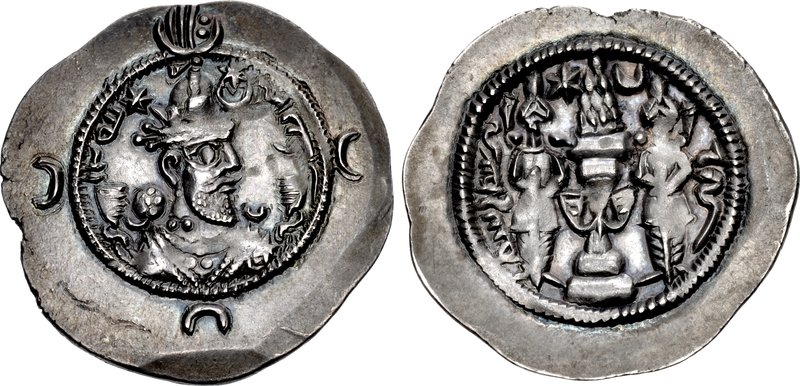
Drachma of Khosrow I, minted at Gundeshapur in 558

The Sassanian revival took place under his rule, so Khosrow minted such inscriptions on his especial issue coinage as "made Iranians fearless" (ērān abē-bēm kard), and "made Iranians strong" (ērān abzonhēnēd).

== Philosopher King ==
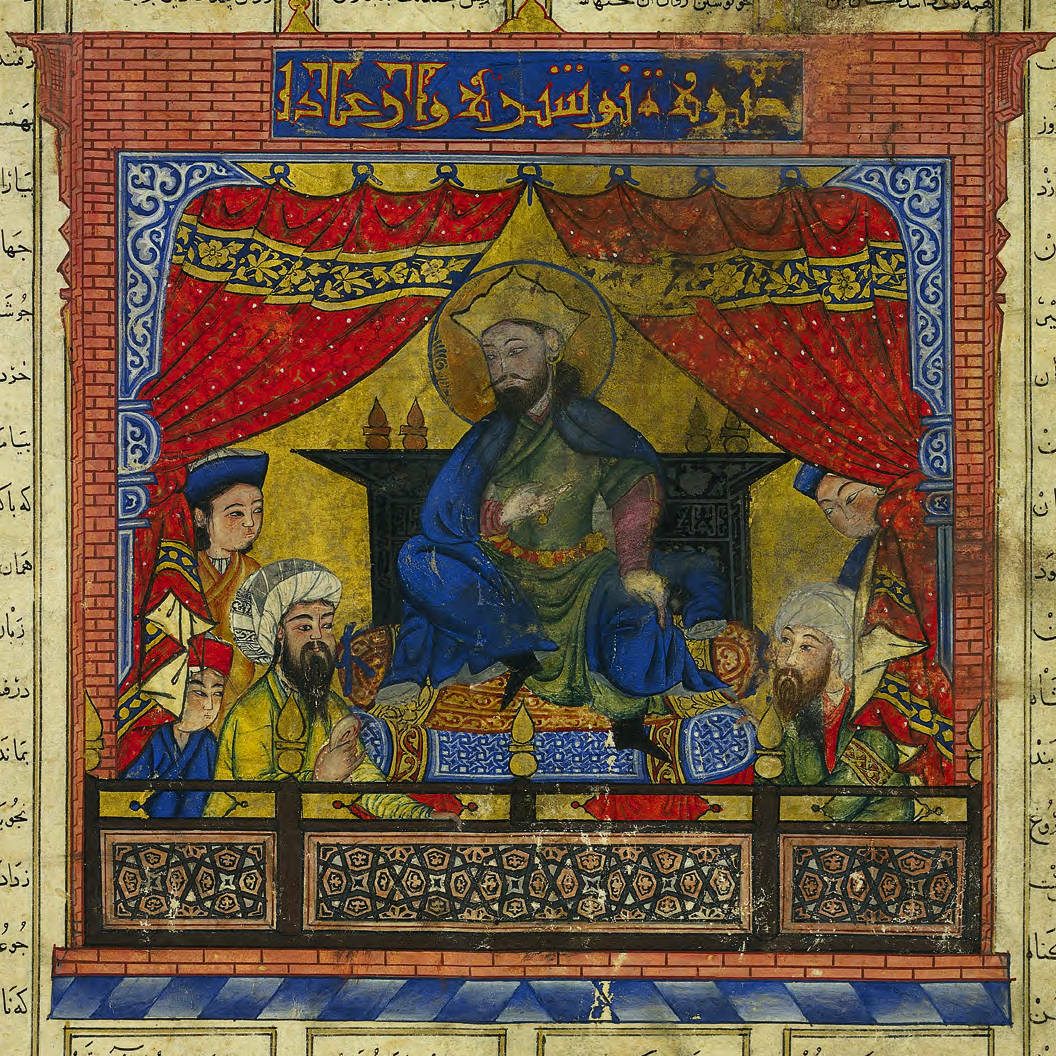
Khosrow I holds a banquet for Bozorgmehr, his vizier.

According to the Byzantine historian Agathias, Khosrow I was admired in Iran and the Roman Empire for his interest in Greek philosophy. Agathias himself rejected these claims, stating that Khosrow's philosophical knowledge was superficial and exaggerated. Scholar Jenny Rose views the reports cited by Agathias as evidence of "Khosrow's self-promotion as a Platonic-type philosopher king".

Later sources also credit Khosrow I with patronizing philosophy and scholarship. The Chronicle of Seert, an anonymous 10th-century Christian Arabic history, states that Khosrow studied philosophy under the Syriac bishop Mar Bar Samma of Qardu and Paul the Persian. In a purported royal autobiography (Kārnāmag), Khosrow claims to have examined the customs and laws of the Romans and Indians alongside those of his ancestors, adopting practices that seemed "reasonable and praiseworthy" regardless of religion or origin.

When the Byzantine emperor Justinian I closed the pagan Neoplatonic academy in Athens in 529, seven Greek philosophers—including Damascius and Simplicius—sought refuge at Khosrow's court, drawn by reports that he embodied Plato's ideal "philosopher king". Disillusioned with conditions at the Sasanian court and Khosrow's limited grasp of philosophy, the philosophers soon returned to the Roman Empire after Khosrow secured a religious tolerance clause for them in the Eternal Peace treaty of 532. Khosrow also showed interest in Indian science, mathematics, and medicine, sending embassies and gifts to the Indian court to invite scholars to teach in Iran. During his reign, he commissioned translations of Greek, Sanskrit, and Syriac texts into Middle Persian. The 19th-century orientalist Theodor Nöldeke described Khosrow I as "certainly one of the most efficient and best kings that the Iranians have ever had".

According to military historian Kaveh Farrokh, a synthesis of Greek, Iranian, Indian, and Armenian learning traditions took place within the Sasanian Empire, fusing Greek pharmacology with Iranian and Indian practices and creating the bimaristan, which he describes as the first hospital to segregate wards according to pathology. Historian Richard Frye similarly suggested that this influx of knowledge produced a renaissance during and after Khosrow's reign. However, specialist historians of medicine reject claims of an advanced Sasanian hospital system with segregated wards, noting that there is no contemporary evidence for such medical institutions in Sasanian Iran and that these features actually developed later in Islamic hospitals during the Abbasid era.

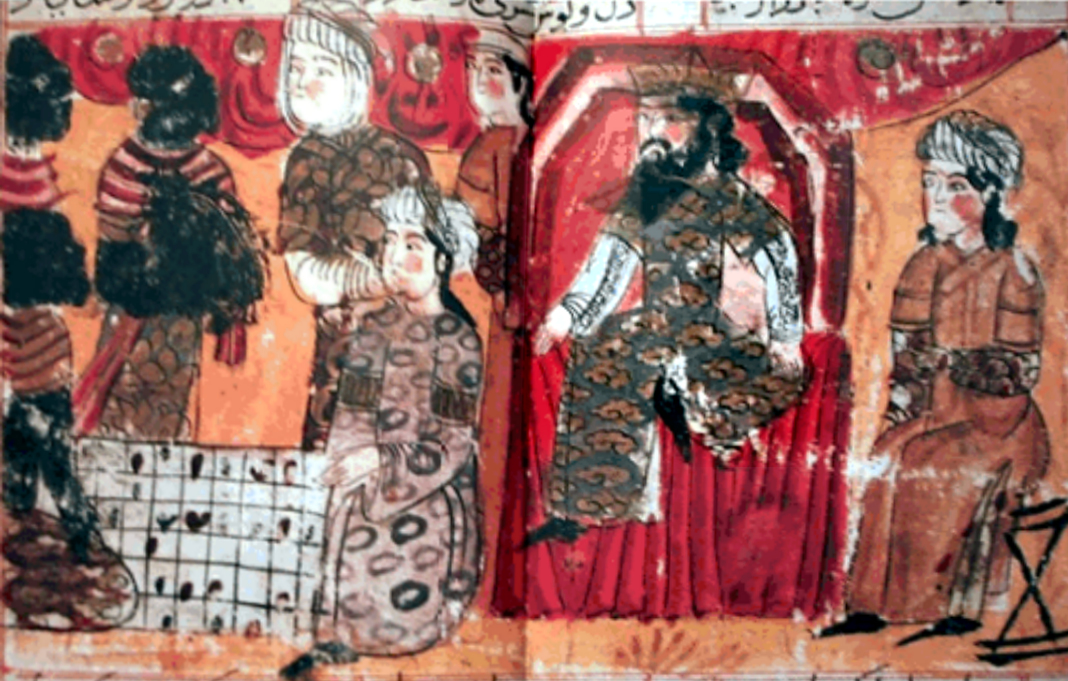
King Khosrow sits before the chessboard, while his vizir and the Indian envoy of Kannauj are playing chess. Shahnama, 10th century CE.

Intellectual games such as chess and backgammon featured in accounts of the diplomatic relationship between Khosrow and a "great king of India". It seems that the Indian ruler who sent the game of chess to Khosrow was the Maukhari King Śarvavarman of Kannauj, between the beginning of Śarvavarman's reign in 560/565 and the end of Khosrow's reign in 579. According to the Middle Persian treatise Wizarishn i Chatrang ("Explanation of Chess"), when the game was sent to Iran it came with a letter which read: "As your name is the King of Kings, all your emperorship over us connotes that your wise men should be wiser than ours. Either you send us an explanation of this game of chess or send revenue and tribute to us." Khosrow's grand vizier, Bozorgmehr, solved the riddle and figured out how to play chess. In response, Bozorgmehr invented the game of backgammon (nard) and sent it to the Indian court with the same challenge; the Indian king was unable to solve the riddle and was forced to pay tribute. As part of these cultural exchanges with India, Khosrow also dispatched the physician Borzuya to bring back Sanskrit medical and literary works, most notably the Panchatantra, which Borzuya translated into Middle Persian as Kalīlag ud Dimnag (the basis for the later Arabic Kalīla wa-Dimna).

=== Academy of Gondishapur ===
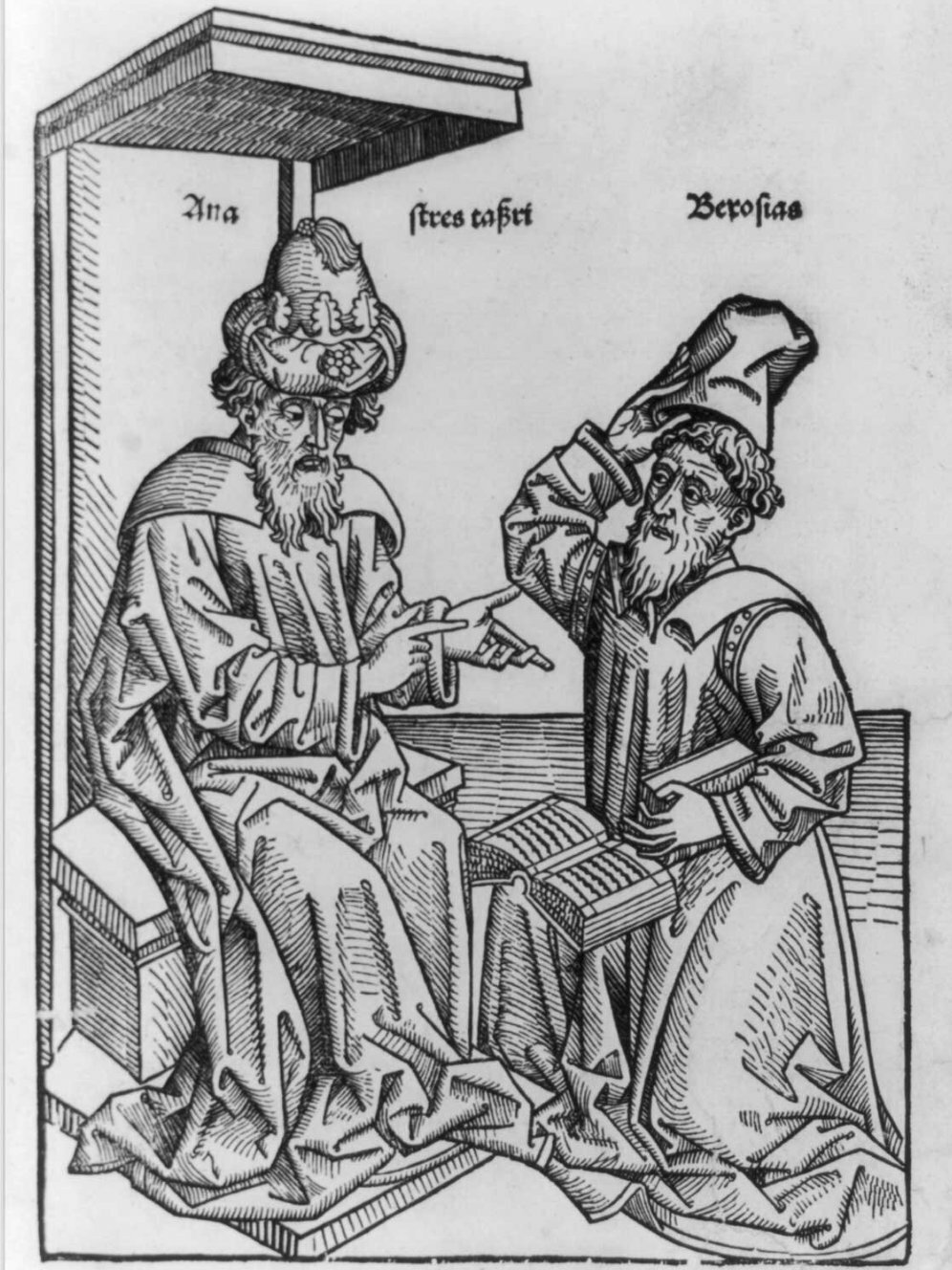
Khosrow I and Borzuya, the translator of the Indian Panchatantra

Traditional accounts credit Khosrow I with expanding the Academy of Gondishapur in the city of Gundeshapur, introducing the study of philosophy, medicine, physics, poetry, rhetoric, and astronomy into the Sasanian court. According to the 10th-century Middle Persian compendium Denkard, efforts to collect non-religious texts and add them to the Avesta had begun earlier under Shapur I in the third century CE. Kaveh Farrokh writes that the learning center at Gondishapur was built to provide a place for incoming Greek refugees to study and share their knowledge, combining Greek, Indian, Iranian, and Syriac scientific traditions.

Modern scholars question the historicity of a formal academy at Gondishapur, noting that no contemporary Sasanian sources mention a medical school or philosophical center in the city. Lutz Richter-Bernburg and A. Shapur Shahbazi state that the legend of a grand Sasanian medical academy at Gondishapur was largely invented during the Abbasid era by the Bukhtishu family of Christian physicians from Gondishapur to elevate their status at the caliphal court in Baghdad.

== Legacy ==
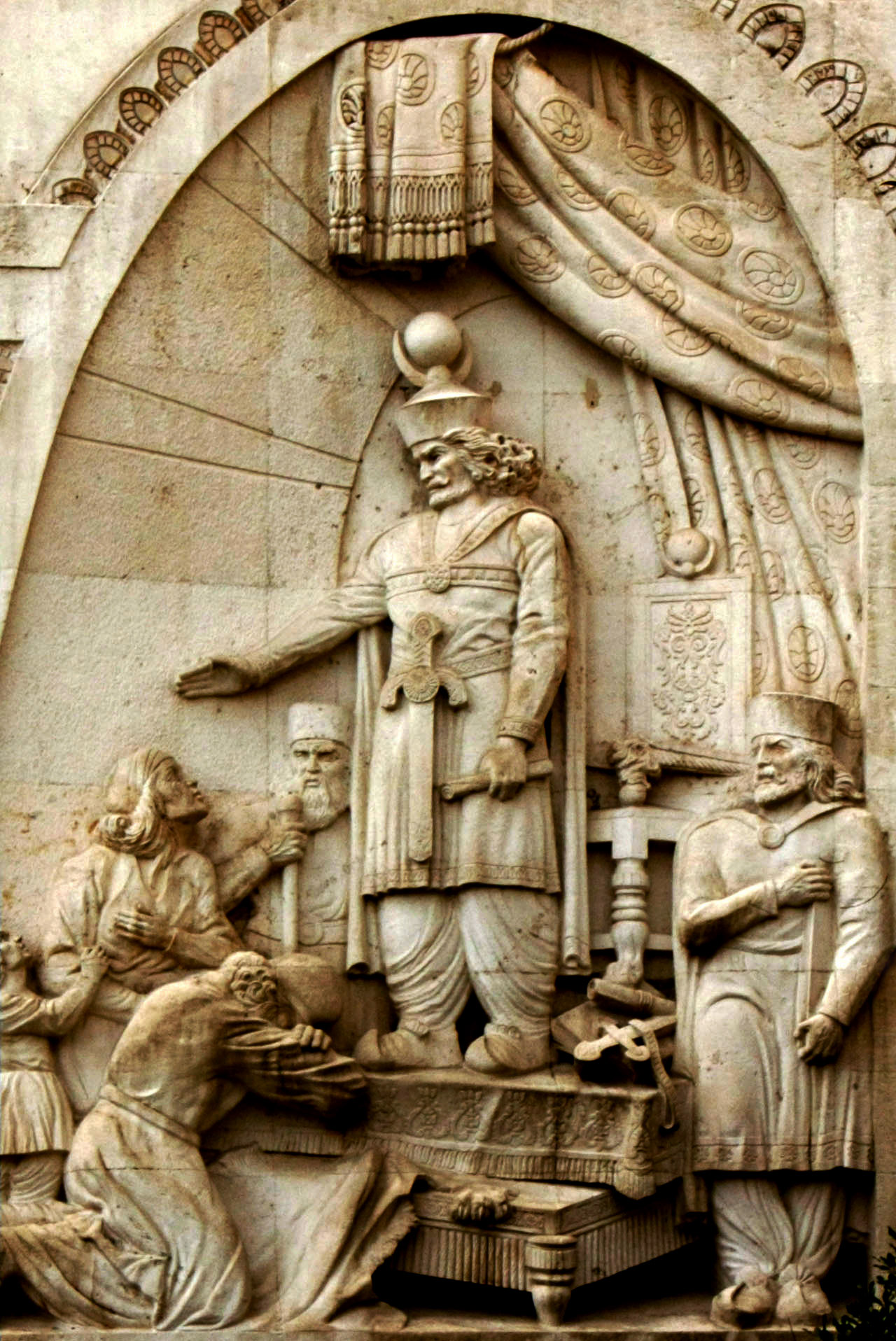
Anushiruwan the Just statue in Tehran courthouse, commissioned during the reign of the Pahlavi dynasty.

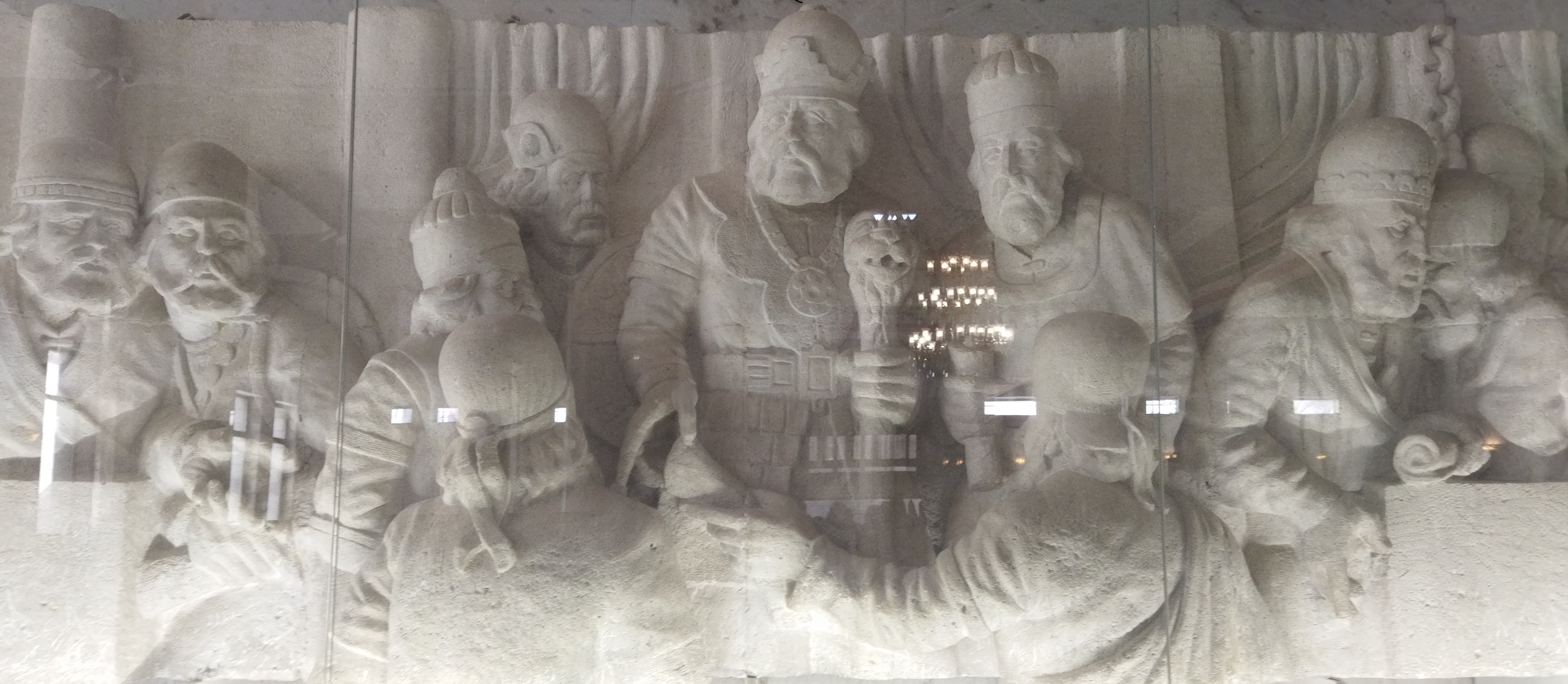
Anushiruwan the Just statue in Tomb of Ferdowsi at Mashhad, commissioned during the reign of the Pahlavi dynasty

Although Khosrow's achievements were highly successful and helped centralize the empire, they did not last long after his death. The local officials and great noble families resented the fact that their power had been stripped away from them and began to quickly regain power after his death. Khosrow's reign had a major impact on Islamic culture and political life. Many of his policies and reforms were brought into the Islamic period in their transformation from a decentralized confederation into a centralized empire.

There are a considerable number of Islamic works that were inspired by the reign of Khosrow I, for example the Kitab al-Taj of Jahiz. The high number of Islamic texts referring to Khosrow's reign can make it hard to distinguish fact from fallacy.

During his reign the Silk Road between ancient China, India and the western world was promoted and possibly even created. Richard Frye argues that Khosrow's rationale behind his numerous wars with the Byzantine empire as well as the eastern Hephthalites was to establish the Sasanian dominance on this trade route.

== Family tree ==
Kavad I (r. 488–496, 498–531)
Kawus	Zamasp	Xerxes	Khosrow I (r. 531–579)
Shapur	Kavad
Anushzad	Hormizd IV (r. 579–590)	Yazdandad

== Bibliography ==
=== Ancient works ===
- Procopius, History of the Wars.

=== Modern works ===
- Axworthy, Michael (2008). A History of Iran: Empire of the Mind. New York: Basic Books. pp. 1–368. ISBN 978-0-465-00888-9.
- Bivar, A. D. H. (2003). "Hephthalites". In Yarshater, Ehsan (ed.). Encyclopædia Iranica. Vol. XII/2: Hedāyat al-mota'allemin–Herat VII. London and New York: Routledge & Kegan Paul. pp. 198–201. ISBN 978-0-933273-75-7.
- Bosworth, C. E., ed. (1999). The History of al-Ṭabarī, Volume V: The Sāsānids, the Byzantines, the Lakhmids, and Yemen. SUNY Series in Near Eastern Studies. Albany, New York: State University of New York Press. ISBN 978-0-7914-4355-2.
- Boyce, Mary (2001). Zoroastrians: Their Religious Beliefs and Practices. Psychology Press. pp. 1–252. ISBN 978-0-415-23902-8.
- Bury, John Bagnell (1958) [1923]. History of the Later Roman Empire: From the Death of Theodosius I to the Death of Justinian, Volume 2. Mineola, New York: Dover Publications. OCLC 41478187.
- Calmard, Jean (1988). "Kermanshah iv. History to 1953". Encyclopaedia Iranica, Volume XVI, Fasc. 3. pp. 319–324.
- Canepa, Matthew P. (2009). The Two Eyes of the Earth: Art and Ritual of Kingship Between Rome and Sasanian Iran. University of California Press. ISBN 978-0-520-25727-6.
- Canepa, Matthew (2018). "Weh-andīōg-husraw (Rūmagān)". In Nicholson, Oliver (ed.). The Oxford Dictionary of Late Antiquity. Oxford: Oxford University Press. ISBN 978-0-19-866277-8.
- Chaumont, M. L. (1985). "Albania". Encyclopaedia Iranica, Volume I, Fasc. 8. pp. 806–810.
- Chaumont, M. L.; Schippmann, K. (1988). "Balāš, Sasanian king of kings". Encyclopaedia Iranica, Volume III, Fasc. 6. pp. 574–580.
- Crone, Patricia (1991). "Kavād's Heresy and Mazdak's Revolt". Iran. 29: 21–42. doi:10.2307/4299846. JSTOR 4299846. (registration required)
- Curtis, Vesta Sarkhosh; Stewart, Sarah (2008). The Sasanian Era. I.B.Tauris. pp. 1–200. ISBN 978-0-85771-972-0.
- Dąbrowa, Edward (2012). "The Arsacid Empire". In Daryaee, Touraj (ed.). The Oxford Handbook of Iranian History. Oxford University Press. pp. 1–432. ISBN 978-0-19-987575-7.
- Daryaee, Touraj (2009). "Šāpur II". Encyclopaedia Iranica.
- Daryaee, Touraj (2014a). Sasanian Persia: The Rise and Fall of an Empire. I.B.Tauris. pp. 1–240. ISBN 978-0-85771-666-8.
- Daryaee, Touraj (2014b). The Oxford Handbook of Iranian History. Oxford University Press. ISBN 978-0-19-939042-7.
- Daryaee, Touraj; Rezakhani, Khodadad (2017). "The Sasanian Empire". In Daryaee, Touraj (ed.). King of the Seven Climes: A History of the Ancient Iranian World (3000 BCE - 651 CE). UCI Jordan Center for Persian Studies. pp. 1–236. ISBN 978-0-692-86440-1.
- Daryaee, Touraj; Canepa, Matthew (2018). "Mazdak". In Nicholson, Oliver (ed.). The Oxford Dictionary of Late Antiquity. Oxford: Oxford University Press. ISBN 978-0-19-866277-8.
- Daryaee, Touraj; Nicholson, Oliver (2018). "Qobad I (MP Kawād)". In Nicholson, Oliver (ed.). The Oxford Dictionary of Late Antiquity. Oxford: Oxford University Press. ISBN 978-0-19-866277-8.
- Daryaee, Touraj. "Yazdegerd II". Encyclopaedia Iranica.
- Dignas, Beate; Winter, Engelbert (2007). Rome and Persia in Late Antiquity. Cambridge.
- Farrokh, Kaveh (2007). Shadows in the Desert. Osprey Publishing.
- Frye, R. N. (1984). "The reforms of Chosroes Anushirvan ('Of the Immortal soul')". The History of Ancient Iran – via fordham.edu/.
- Frye, R. N. (1983). "The political history of Iran under the Sasanians". In Yarshater, Ehsan (ed.). The Cambridge History of Iran: The Seleucid, Parthian and Sasanian Periods. Vol. 3(1). Cambridge: Cambridge University Press. ISBN 0-521-20092-X.
- Gadjiev, Murtazali (2017a). "Apzut Kawāt wall". Encyclopaedia Iranica.
- Gadjiev, Murtazali (2017b). "Construction Activities of Kavād I in Caucasian Albania". Iran and the Caucasus. 21 (2). Brill: 121–131. doi:10.1163/1573384X-20170202.
- Gariboldi, Andrea; Rubin, Zeev; Schindel, Nikolaus (2020). "Ḵosrow I i: Life and Times". Encyclopaedia Iranica Online. Brill. doi:10.1163/2330-4804_EIRO_COM_11831. hdl:11368/3058858.
- Gaube, H. (1986). "Arrajān". Encyclopaedia Iranica, Volume II, Fasc. 5. pp. 519–520.
- Greatrex, Geoffrey; Lieu, Samuel N. C. (2002). "Justinian's First Persian War and the Eternal Peace". The Roman Eastern Frontier and the Persian Wars (Part II, 363–630 AD). New York, New York and London, United Kingdom: Routledge. pp. 82–97. ISBN 0-415-14687-9.
- Hillenbrand, R. (1986). "Ardestān". Encyclopaedia Iranica, Volume II, Fasc. 4. pp. 385–387.
- Howard-Johnston, James (2013). "Military Infrastructure in the Roman Provinces North and South of the Armenian Taurus in Late Antiquity". In Sarantis, Alexander; Christie, Neil (eds.). War and Warfare in Late Antiquity: Current Perspectives. Brill. ISBN 978-90-04-25257-8.
- Kettenhofen, Erich (1994). "Darband". Encyclopædia Iranica, Volume VII. pp. 13–19.
- Khaleghi-Motlagh, Dj. (1988). "Bahman (2) Son of Esfandīār". Encyclopaedia Iranica, Volume III, Fasc. 5. pp. 489–490.
- Kia, Mehrdad (2016). The Persian Empire: A Historical Encyclopedia [2 volumes]: A Historical Encyclopedia. ABC-CLIO. ISBN 978-1-61069-391-2.
- Litvinsky, B. A.; Dani, Ahmad Hasan (1996). History of Civilizations of Central Asia: The crossroads of civilizations, A.D. 250 to 750. UNESCO. pp. 1–569. ISBN 978-92-3-103211-0.
- Maas, Michael, ed. (2005). The Cambridge Companion to the Age of Justinian. Cambridge, United Kingdom: Cambridge University Press. ISBN 978-0-521-81746-2.
- Martindale, John R., ed. (1980). The Prosopography of the Later Roman Empire: Volume II, AD 395–527. Cambridge: Cambridge University Press. ISBN 0-521-20159-4.
- Martindale, John R., ed. (1992). The Prosopography of the Later Roman Empire: Volume III, AD 527–641. Cambridge: Cambridge University Press. ISBN 0-521-20160-8.
- McDonough, Scott (2011). "The Legs of the Throne: Kings, Elites, and Subjects in Sasanian Iran". In Arnason, Johann P.; Raaflaub, Kurt A. (eds.). The Roman Empire in Context: Historical and Comparative Perspectives. John Wiley & Sons, Ltd. pp. 290–321. doi:10.1002/9781444390186.ch13. ISBN 978-1-4443-9018-6.
- McDonough, Scott (2013). "Military and Society in Sasanian Iran". In Campbell, Brian; Tritle, Lawrence A. (eds.). The Oxford Handbook of Warfare in the Classical World. Oxford University Press. pp. 1–783. ISBN 978-0-19-530465-7.
- Meyer, Eduard (1911). "Chosroes s.v. Chosroes I." . In Chisholm, Hugh (ed.). Encyclopædia Britannica. Vol. 6 (11th ed.). Cambridge University Press. pp. 271–272.
- Morony, Michael G. (1993). "al-Nahrawān". In Bosworth, C. E.; van Donzel, E.; Heinrichs, W. P. & Pellat, Ch. (eds.). The Encyclopaedia of Islam, Second Edition. Volume VII: Mif–Naz. Leiden: E. J. Brill. pp. 912–913. ISBN 978-90-04-09419-2.
- Langarudi, Rezazadeh (2002). "Fahraj". Encyclopaedia Iranica.
- Modarres, Ali. "Meybod". Encyclopaedia Iranica.
- Nicholson, Oliver; Canepa, Matthew; Daryaee, Touraj (2018). "Khosrow I Anoshirvan". In Nicholson, Oliver (ed.). The Oxford Dictionary of Late Antiquity. Oxford: Oxford University Press. ISBN 978-0-19-866277-8.
- Payne, Richard E. (2015a). A State of Mixture: Christians, Zoroastrians, and Iranian Political Culture in Late Antiquity. Univ of California Press. pp. 1–320. ISBN 978-0-520-96153-1.
- Payne, Richard E. (2015b). "The Reinvention of Iran: The Sasanian Empire and the Huns". In Maas, Michael (ed.). The Cambridge Companion to the Age of Attila. Cambridge University Press. pp. 282–299. ISBN 978-1-107-63388-9.
- Potts, Daniel T. (2018). "Sasanian Iran and its northeastern frontier". In Mass, Michael; Di Cosmo, Nicola (eds.). Empires and Exchanges in Eurasian Late Antiquity. Cambridge University Press. pp. 1–538. ISBN 978-1-316-14604-0.
- Pourshariati, Parvaneh (2008). Decline and Fall of the Sasanian Empire: The Sasanian-Parthian Confederacy and the Arab Conquest of Iran. London and New York: I.B. Tauris. ISBN 978-1-84511-645-3.
- Pourshariati, Parvaneh (2017). "Kārin". Encyclopaedia Iranica.
- Pulleyblank, Edwin G. (1991). "Chinese-Iranian relations i. In Pre-Islamic Times". Encyclopaedia Iranica, Volume V, Fasc. 4. pp. 424–431.
- Rekavandi, Hamid Omrani; Sauer, Eberhard W. (2013). "Tamiša Wall". Encyclopaedia Iranica.
- Rezakhani, Khodadad (2017). ReOrienting the Sasanians: East Iran in Late Antiquity. Edinburgh University Press. pp. 1–256. ISBN 978-1-4744-0030-5.
- Sauer, Eberhard (2017). Sasanian Persia: Between Rome and the Steppes of Eurasia. London and New York: Edinburgh University Press. pp. 1–336. ISBN 978-1-4744-0102-9.
- Schindel, Nikolaus (2013a). "Kawād I i. Reign". Encyclopaedia Iranica, Volume XVI, Fasc. 2. pp. 136–141.
- Schindel, Nikolaus (2013b). "Kawād I ii. Coinage". Encyclopaedia Iranica, Volume XVI, Fasc. 2. pp. 141–143.
- Schindel, Nikolaus (2013c). "Sasanian Coinage". In Potts, Daniel T. (ed.). The Oxford Handbook of Ancient Iran. Oxford University Press. ISBN 978-0-19-973330-9.
- Schindel, Nikolaus (2022). Sylloge Nummorum Sasanidarum IV: Khusro I. Vol. 1 and 2. Vienna: ÖAI. ISBN 978-3-7001-8987-9.
- Shahbazi, A. Sh. (1988). "BAHRĀM (2)". Encyclopaedia Iranica, Volume III, Fasc. 5. pp. 514–522.
- Shahbazi, A. Shapur (1989). "BESṬĀM O BENDŌY". Encyclopaedia Iranica, Volume IV, Fasc. 2. pp. 180–182.
- Shahbazi, A. Shapur (1993). "Crown Prince". Encyclopaedia Iranica, Volume VI, Fasc. 4. London u.a.: Routledge & Kegan Paul. pp. 430–432. ISBN 90-04-08114-3.
- Shahbazi, A. Shapur (2005). "Sasanian dynasty". Encyclopaedia Iranica, Online Edition.
- Sundermann, W. (1986). "Artēštārān sālār". Encyclopaedia Iranica, Volume II, Fasc. 6. p. 662.
- Shahîd, Irfan (1995). Byzantium and the Arabs in the Sixth Century. Volume 1, Part 1: Political and Military History. Washington, DC: Dumbarton Oaks Research Library and Collection. ISBN 978-0-88402-214-5.
- Shayegan, M. Rahim (2017). "Sasanian political ideology". In Potts, Daniel T. (ed.). The Oxford Handbook of Ancient Iran. Oxford University Press. pp. 1–1021. ISBN 978-0-19-066866-2.
- Skjærvø, Prods Oktor (2000). "Kayāniān vii. Kauui Haosrauuah, Kay Husrōy, Kay Ḵosrow". Encyclopaedia Iranica.
- Tafazzoli, Ahmad (1989). "Bozorgān". Encyclopaedia Iranica, Volume IV, Fasc. 4. Ahmad Tafazzoli. p. 427.
- Tafazzoli, Aḥmad (1997). "Education ii. In the Parthian and Sasanian periods". Encyclopaedia Iranica, Volume VIII, Fasc. 2. pp. 179–180.

Khosrow I Sasanian dynasty Born: c. 514 Died: February 579
Preceded by Kavad I	King of Kings of Iran and non-Iran; 531–579	Succeeded by Hormizd IV
