= Suristan =

The Middle Persian toponym Sūristān, used during the Sasanian period (224–651), had two meanings:

- Sūristān, another name for Asoristan, the Sasanian province also known as "Dil-i Ērānshahr"
- Sūristān, today's Kufa in Iraq, according to al-Baladhuri's account of the foundation of Kufa

== Sources ==
- Sakly, Mondher & Darley-Doran, R. (2002). "Wāsiṭ". In Bearman, P. J.; Bianquis, Th.; Bosworth, C. E.; van Donzel, E. & Heinrichs, W. P. (eds.). The Encyclopaedia of Islam, Second Edition. Volume XI: W–Z. Leiden: E. J. Brill. doi:10.1163/1573-3912_islam_COM_1343. ISBN 978-90-04-12756-2.
- Schaeder, H. H. (1997). "Sawād". In Bosworth, C. E.; van Donzel, E.; Heinrichs, W. P. & Lecomte, G. (eds.). The Encyclopaedia of Islam, Second Edition. Volume IX: San–Sze. Leiden: E. J. Brill. doi:10.1163/1573-3912_islam_SIM_6666. ISBN 978-90-04-10422-8.
