= Khwarwaran =

Khvārvarān was a military quarter of the Sasanian Empire. Intensive irrigation agriculture of the lower Tigris and Euphrates and of tributaries such as the Diyala and the Karun formed the empire's main resource base.

== Etymology ==
The Arabic term Iraq was not used at this time. In the mid-6th century, the Sasanian Empire was divided by Khosrow I into four quarters. The western one was called Khvārvarān and included most of modern Iraq and was subdivided to the provinces of Meshan, Asuristan, Adiabene and Media. The term Iraq is widely used in the medieval Arabic sources for the area in the centre and the south of the modern republic as a geographic rather than a political, term, implying no precise boundaries.

The area of modern Iraq north of Tikrit was known in Muslim times as Al-Jazirah, which means "The Island" and refers to the "island" between the Tigris and Euphrates rivers. To the south and the.west lay the Arabian deserts, inhabited largely by Arab tribesmen who occasionally acknowledged the overlordship of the Sasanian Emperors.

Until 602, the desert frontier of greater Iran had been guarded by the Lakhmid kings of Al-Hira, who were themselves Arabs but ruled a settled buffer state. In that year, Shahanshah Khosrow II Aparviz rashly abolished the Lakhmid Kingdom and laid the frontier open to nomad incursions. Farther north, the western quarter was bounded by the Byzantine Empire. The frontier more or less followed the modern Syria-Iraq border and continued northward into modern Turkey, leaving Nisibis (modern Nusaybin) as the Sasanian frontier fortress while the Byzantines held Dara and nearby Amida (modern Diyarbakır).

== Ethnic diversity and religion ==
The inhabitants were very mixed. The aristocratic and administrative upper class was mostly Persian, and the urban centers were a diverse mix of Iranians and Aramaic-speakers, while the rural population consisted mostly of the latter. There were a number of Tāzis (Arabs), most of whom lived as pastoralists along the western margins of the settled lands, but some lived as townspeople, especially in Hireh (al-Hira). In addition, there was a surprisingly large number of Greeks, mostly prisoners who had been captured during the numerous Sasanian campaigns into Byzantine Syria.

Ethnic diversity was matched by religious pluralism. The Sasanian state religion, Zoroastrianism, was largely confined to the Iranians. The rest of the population, especially in Mesopotamia and the northern parts of the country, were Christians. They were sharply divided by doctrinal differences into Monophysites, who were.linked to the Jacobite church of Syria, and Nestorians.

The Nestorians, who originally converted from Ashurism and Manichaenism, were the most widespread and were tolerated by the Sasanian Emperors because of their opposition to the Christians of the Roman Empire, who regarded the Nestorians as heretics. Many Nestorians were deported to southern provinces, south of Persian Gulf, such as Mishmāhig (now Bahrain and UAE), Garrhae (now Saudi coast of Persian Gulf). The Monophysites were regarded with more suspicion and were occasionally persecuted, but both groups maintained an ecclesiastical hierarchy, and the Nestorians had an important intellectual centre at Nisibis. The area around the ancient city of Babylon now had a large population of Jews, both descendants of the exiles of Old Testament times and local converts. In addition, in the southern half of the country were numerous adherents of the old Babylonian polytheism, as well as Mandaeans and Gnostics.

In the early 7th century, the stability and the prosperity of the multicultural society were threatened by invasion. In 602, Khosrow II Aparviz launched the last great Iranian invasion of the Byzantine Empire. At first, he was spectacularly successful. Syria and Egypt fell, and Constantinople itself was threatened. Later, the tide began to turn, and in 627-628, the Byzantines, under the leadership of the Heraclius, invaded Khvārvarān province and sacked the imperial capital at Tyspawn (Ctesiphon). The invaders did not remain, but Khosrow was discredited, deposed and executed.

Then followed a period of infighting among generals and members of the Imperial family, which left the country without clear leadership. The chaos had also damaged irrigation systems, and it was probably then that large areas in the south of the country reverted to marshlands, which they have remained ever since. It was with that devastated land that the earliest Muslim raiders came into contact.

== Arab conquest and early Islamic period ==
The first conflict between local Arab-Bedouin tribes and Iranian forces seems to have been in 634, when the Arabs were defeated at the Battle of the Bridge. There was a force of some 5,000 Muslims under Abu 'Ubayd ath-Thaqafi, which was routed by the Iranians. In 637, a much larger Arab force, under Sa'ad ibn Abi Waqqas, defeated the main Iranian army at the Battle of Al-Qadisiyya and later sack the capital of the Iranian Empire, Ctesiphon. By the end of the following year (638), the Muslims had conquered almost all of the Western Iranian provinces (modern Iraq), and the last Sasanian Emperor, Yazdegerd III, had fled to central and then northern Iran, where he was killed in 651.

The Islamic conquest was followed by a mass immigration of Arabs from eastern Arabia and Mazun (Oman) to Khvarvaran. The new arrivals did not disperse or settle throughout the country; instead, they established two new garrison cities, at Al-Kufah, near ancient Babylon, and at Basra in the south.

The intention was that the Muslims should be a separate community of fighting men and their families that lived off taxes paid by the local inhabitants. Mosul began to emerge as the most important city and the base of a Muslim governor and garrison. Apart from the Iranian elite and the Zoroastrian priests who did not convert to Islam, who lost their lives and had their property confiscated, most Iranian people became Muslim and were allowed to keep their possessions.

Khvarvaran was now became a province of the Muslim Caliphate with a new name, Iraq.

At first, the capital of the caliphate was at Madinah (al-Medina), but after the murder of the third caliph, 'Uthman, in 656, his successor, the Prophet's cousin and son-in-law 'Ali, made Iraq his base. In 661, however, 'Ali was murdered in Al-Kufah, and the caliphate passed to the rival Umayyad family in Syria. This ancient Iranian province became a subordinate province even though it was the richest area of the Muslim world and the one with the largest Muslim population.

== See also ==
- Parthian Empire

== Sources ==
- S., Suren-Pahlav, Khvārvarān Province (Nowadays Iraq), (1999).
