= Gregory the Commander =

Sasanian military leader

Gregory the Commander was a Sasanian military leader from the House of Mihran, who denounced Zoroastrianism and converted to Christianity, but was later as a result executed between 555-562.

== Biography ==
A native of Ray, Gregory converted to Christianity in 518 during a feast before many other Sasanian soldiers. However, this didn't bother king Khosrow I (r. 531-579), who in 534 appointed Gregory as the commander of the Sasanian army in the Caucasus. This resulted in discontent amongst members of the court, who pressured Khosrow to deal with an apostate from such a powerful and influential family, stating that "It is a great dishonor for the religion of the Magians that such a great man from the lineage of the house of Mihran, who have always been servants of Ohrmazd, now becomes a servant of Christ." Khosrow was thus forced to have Gregory relieved and incarcerated, yet the Mihranids deemed Khosrow's choice insufficient. A son of Gregory's paternal uncle, Mihran, asked Khosrow to execute Gregory for "bringing dishonor to our lineage." The latter was in a good position to make such request, due to recently having defeated the Hephthalites in the east; Gregory was eventually executed.

== Sources ==
- Payne, Richard E. (2015). A State of Mixture: Christians, Zoroastrians, and Iranian Political Culture in Late Antiquity. Univ of California Press. pp. 1–320. ISBN 9780520961531.
- Brunner, C. J. (1984). "AḴŠONVĀR". Encyclopaedia Iranica, Vol. 1, Fasc. 7. pp. 729–730.
