= Tribunus (physician) =

Tribunus or Tribounos (Greek: Τριβοῦνος) was a highly esteemed physician of the Roman Empire during the reign of Justinian. A native of Palestine, he was renowned for his medical skill, extensive learning, and deep piety. He was described as "a man of great learning and inferior to none in medical skill, and was furthermore a temperate and God-fearing man of the highest worth" (ὁ δὲ Τριβοῦνος οὗτος λόγιος μὲν ἦν καὶ τὰ ἐς τέχνην τὴν ἰατρικὴν οὐδενὸς ἥσσων, ἄλλως δὲ σώφρων τε καὶ θεοφιλὴς καὶ τῆς ἐπιεικείας ἐς ἄκρον ἥκων).

The Sassanian king Chosroes I, who was by nature of a sickly constitution, often gathered physicians from many lands, among whom was Tribunus. On one notable occasion, Tribunus cured Chosroes of a severe disease. When Tribunus later departed from Persia, the king gave him many notable and magnificent gifts for his service.

Later, in 545 AD, during negotiations for a peace treaty with Emperor Justinian, Chosroes requested both financial compensation and that Tribunus be sent to reside with him for one year. Justinian agreed, sending Tribunus along with a sum of twenty centenaria (κεντηνάρια; κεντηνάριον was a Byzantine unit of weight, roughly equivalent to 32 kilograms; Procopius does not specify whether the sum was in gold, silver, or other valuable commodities), and thus a treaty was concluded between the Romans and the Persians.

While in Persia, Tribunus established a hospital.

At the end of this period, Chosroes invited Tribunus to ask for whatever reward he wished before he returned home. Tribunus asked for nothing except the release of Roman captives. Chosroes granted his request, freeing three thousand captives, as well as all those whom Tribunus named individually as notable men. Through this act, Tribunus won great renown among all people.
