= Asoristan =

Sasanian province in Assyria and Babylonia (226–637 CE)

Coordinates: 30°53′41″N 47°34′41″E

Asōristān
- Province of the Sasanian Empire
- 226–637
- Map of Asoristan and its surrounding provinces
- Capital: Ctesiphon
- Historical era: Late Antiquity
  - Sasanian conquest: 226
  - First Muslim campaign: 633
  - Second Muslim campaign: 637
Preceded by	Succeeded by
Parthian Empire	Rashidun Caliphate
- Today part of: Iraq

Asoristan (Middle Persian: 𐭠𐭮𐭥𐭥𐭮𐭲𐭭, Asōristān, Āsūristān), also known as Suristan, was the name of the Sasanian province of Assyria and Babylonia from 226 to 637 CE.

== Name ==
The name Asōristān appears in several Sasanian sources: in Parthian (𐭀𐭎𐭅𐭓𐭎𐭕𐭍), along with the Greek form ΑCCΥΡΙΑΝ (Assyrian), in Shapur I's (r. 240–270) inscription on the Ka'ba-ye Zartosht; in the Paikuli inscription of Narseh (r. 293–303); and in the Bundahishn. It was borrowed into Armenian as Asorestan and appears in Chinese inscriptions. In Syriac Athor denotes Assyria, while Asōristān refers to the ancient land of Babylonia and the adjective āsōrīg means 'Babylonian'. Consequently, Assyria and Asoristan were frequently mixed up. In Syriac, the land called Asoristan was known as Bēth Nahren (Classical Syriac: ܒܝܬ ܢܗܪܝܢ lit. 'between the two rivers'), Bābēl/Bābil, and Ereḫ/Erāq. The Parthians were probably the first to use the term Asōristān ('Assyria') to refer to historical Babylonia. In this, they were followed by the Sasanians.

After the mid-6th century, it was also called Khwārwarān in New Persian. Although it is difficult to determine the true meaning of the renaming of southern Mesopotamia to "Assyria", it is possible that due to the Assyrian kingdom of Adiabene being in the north, it excluded the Assyrians further south and therefore the Persians named it accordingly to include the few million Semitic Mesopotamian people who were descendants of the ancient Assyrians south of Adiabene, contrary to the Greeks renaming Assyrians "Syrians", an Indo-European corruption of "Assyrians". At the very least, names associated with Assyria continued to be used and were not obsolete.

During the Parthian Empire, much of historical Athura lay to the north of Asoristan in the Assyrian inhabited independent frontier provinces of Upper Mesopotamia (in modern Northern Iraq, Southeast Turkey and Northeast Syria): Beth Nuhadra, Beth Garmai, Adiabene, Osroene, Hatra, Tyareh and Assur. When the Sassanid Empire conquered these in the mid-3rd century, they were reincorporated into Asoristan.

== Geographical extent ==
Asoristan was largely identical with ancient Mesopotamia. The northern border is somewhat uncertain but probably went along a line from Anatha to Takrit. Hira was probably the southernmost point, north of Arabia, the border then following the northern part of the swamps of Wasit.

== History ==
=== Names, capital, language ===
During the Achaemenid (550–330 BCE) and Parthian Empires (150 BCE – 225 CE), Achaemenid Assyria had been known by the Old Persian name Athura. Asōristān, Middle Persian "land of Assyria", was the capital province of the Sasanian Empire and was called Dil-ī Ērānshahr, meaning "Heart of Iran". The city of Ctesiphon served as the capital of both the Parthian and Sasanian Empire, and was for some time the largest city in the world.

The main language spoken by the Assyrian people was Eastern Aramaic, which still survives among the Assyrians, with the local Syriac language becoming an important vehicle for Syriac Christianity. The Assyrian Church of the East was founded in Asōristān and it was an important centre of the Syriac Orthodox Church.

=== Parthian client kingdoms ===
The Parthians had exercised only loose control at times, allowing for a number of Assyrian kingdoms to flourish in Upper Mesopotamia in the form of independent Osroene, Adiabene, Beth Nuhadra, Beth Garmai and the Arab-Assyrian state of Hatra. Assyriologists such as Georges Roux and Simo Parpola opine that ancient Assur itself may have been independent during this time.

The Sasanian Empire conquered Assyria and Mesopotamia from the Parthians during the 220s, and by 260 AD had abolished these independent Assyrian city-states and kingdoms, with the 3000-year-old city of Assur being sacked in 256 AD. Some regions appear to have remained partly autonomous as late as the latter part of the fourth century, with an Assyrian king named Sinharib reputedly ruling a part of Assyria in the 370s AD.

Between 633 and 638, the region was invaded by the Arabs during the Muslim conquest of Persia; together with Meshan, it became the province of Iraq. Asōristān was dissolved by 639 AD, bringing an end to over 3000 years of Assyria as a geopolitical entity, although it remained an ecclesiastical province within Syriac Christianity, and Medieval Arabs continued to refer to the indigenous people as Ashuriyun. A century later, the area became the capital province of the Abbasid Caliphate and the center of the Islamic Golden Age for five hundred years, from the 8th to the 13th centuries.

After the Muslim conquest, Asōristān saw a gradual but large influx of Muslim peoples; at first Arabs arriving in the south, but later also including Iranian (Kurdish) and Turkic peoples during the mid to late Middle Ages.

The Assyrian people continued to endure, rejecting Arabization, Turkification and Islamization, and continued to form the majority population of the north as late as the 14th century, until the massacres of Timur drastically reduced their numbers and led to the city of Assur being finally abandoned. After this period, the indigenous Assyrians became the ethnic, linguistic and religious minority in their homeland that they are to this day.

== Population ==
The population of Asorestan was a mixed one, however its naming indicates that there was a large population of Assyrians in southern Mesopotamia, in the region that was once Babylonia. The Assyrians lived in the northern half while their ethnically indistinguishable brethren formerly known as Babylonians lived in the south, including the still extant Mandaeans who, like the Assyrians, are indigenous to Mesopotamia. Nabateans and Arameans dwelt in the far southwestern deserts, and minorities of Persians, Armenians and Jews lived throughout Mesopotamia. The small Greek element in the southern cities, still strong in the Parthian period, was absorbed by the Assyrians in Sasanian times. The majority of the population was Assyrian, Jewish, and Mandaean, speaking Akkadian-influenced Eastern Aramaic languages, some of which still survive as Northeastern Neo-Aramaic among the Assyrians and Mandeans. As the breadbasket of the Sasanian Empire, most of the population was engaged in agriculture or worked as soldiers, traders, and merchants. The Persians lived in various parts of the province; Persian garrison soldiers lived along the outer fringe of southern and western Asoristan; Persian noble families lived in the major cities, while some Persian peasants lived in the villages in Lower Mesopotamia. The native Assyrians played a very active role in the province and were found in the administrative class of society as army officers, civil servants, and feudal lords.

== Language ==
At least three dialects of Eastern Middle Aramaic were in spoken and liturgical use, many of which are descended from the Imperial Aramaic introduced by Tiglath-Pileser III as the lingua franca of the Neo-Assyrian Empire in the 8th century BC: Classical Syriac, mainly in the north and among Syriac Christians throughout the region; Classical Mandaic by the Mandaeans, and Jewish Babylonian Aramaic by the Jews. Other colloquial but unnamed or unrecorded Eastern Middle Aramaic dialects were also spoken. Some Eastern Aramaic languages survive as the NENA languages and Turoyo, with estimates ranging from 577,000 to 1,000,000 fluent speakers, with a far smaller number of speakers of Neo-Mandaic still extant.

Aside from the liturgical scriptures of these religions which exist today, archaeological examples of all three of these dialects can be found in the collections of thousands of Aramaic incantation bowls—ceramic artifacts dated to this era—discovered in Iraq, northeast Syria and southeast Turkey. While the Jewish Aramaic script called Ktav Ashuri retained the original "square" or "block" style used to write Imperial Aramaic, the Syriac alphabet and the Mandaic alphabet developed when cursive styles began to appear. The Mandaic alphabet likely evolved from Inscriptional Parthian.

Vernacular Middle Persian, known as dari (as opposed to the higher register—parsi—used for administrative, religious, and literary purposes), was the common language of the capital of Ctesiphon. In the first centuries after the Muslim conquests, dari Middle Persian probably lost speakers in Iraq but continued to be used by city-dwellers in the region until at least the 10th century AD.

== Religion ==
The religious demography of Mesopotamia was very diverse during late antiquity. From the 1st and 2nd centuries Syriac Christianity became the primary religion, while other groups practiced Mandaeism, Judaism, Manichaeism, Zoroastrianism, and the ancient Assyro-Babylonian Mesopotamian religion. Assyrian Christians of the Syriac Orthodox Church and Assyrian Church of the East were probably the most numerous group in the province.

=== Ancient Mesopotamian religion ===
Ancient Mesopotamian religion remained strong in places, particularly in Upper Mesopotamia. Temples were still being dedicated to Ashur, Shamash, Ishtar, Sin, Hadad, Dumuzid, Nergal, Bel and Ninurta in Assur, Arbela, Edessa, Amid, Nohadra, Kirkuk, Sinjar, Nineveh Plains, and Harran among other places, during the 3rd and 4th centuries, and traces would survive into the 10th century in remote parts of Mesopotamia.

=== Christianity ===
Asorestan, and particularly Assyria proper, were the centers for the Church of the East (now split into the Assyrian Church of the East, the Ancient Church of the East and the Chaldean Catholic Church), which at one time extended far beyond the confines of the by then defunct Sasanian empire and was the most widespread Christian church in the world, reaching well into Central Asia, China, Mongolia Tibet and India as well as the Aegean. It sees as its founders the apostle Thomas (Mar Toma), and Saint Thaddeus (Mar Addai), and used the distinctly Syriac version of Eastern Aramaic for its scriptures and liturgy. The Holy Qurbana of Addai and Mari is one of the oldest Eucharistic prayers in Christianity, composed around the year 200 AD. The Church of the East was consolidated in 410 at the Council of Seleucia-Ctesiphon, held at the Sasanian capital, Selucia-Ctesiphon, which remained the seat of the Patriarchate of the Church of the East for over 600 years.

=== Mandaeism ===
The Mandaeans, who are according to their traditions the original followers of John the Baptist, are the last surviving Gnostics from antiquity. According to most scholars, Mandaeism originated sometime in the first three centuries CE, in either southwestern Mesopotamia or Syria (the southeastern Levant especially). However, some scholars take the view that Mandaeism is older and dates from pre-Christian times. Mandaeans assert that their religion predates Judaism, Christianity, and Islam as a monotheistic faith. Their language and script is Mandaic, a form of Aramaic. Two of their important religious texts, written between the 1st and 3rd centuries, are the Ginza Rabba and the Mandaean Book of John (preserving original traditions about John the Baptist). The Mandaean population numbers between 60,000 and 100,000 today. Mandaeism flourished in the Parthian and early Sassanid period in the region.

=== Manichaeism ===
The religion of Manichaeism, founded by Mani (216–276), originated in 3rd century Asorestan, and spread across a vast geographical area. In some instances, Manichaeism even surpassed the Assyrian Church of the East in its reach, as it was for a time also widespread in the Roman Empire. While none of the six original Syriac scriptures of the Manichaeans have survived in their entirety, a long Syriac section of one of their works detailing key beliefs was preserved by Theodore Bar Konai (a Church of the East author from Beth Garmaï), in his book Ketba Deskolion written in about 792. Like the Church of the East, the traditional center of the Manichaean church was in Seleucia-Ctesiphon. Mani dedicated his only Middle Persian writing, the Shāpuragān, to Shapur I.

=== Judaism ===
The Jewish community of Babylonia came to prominence in the 3rd century CE as a center of Jewish scholarship owing to the decline of the Jewish population in the Land of Israel. The Jewish–Roman wars, the Crisis of the Third Century, and Rome's conversion to Christianity all led to an increase in Jewish immigration to Asoristan, and the region became the main center of Judaism in late antiquity. This set the stage for the composition of the major book defining Rabbinic Judaism, the Babylonian Talmud, which was written in Jewish Babylonian Aramaic in Asoristan between the 3rd and 5th centuries. The Babylonian Talmudic academies were all established relatively near to Seleucia-Ctesiphon. The first Talmudic academy was founded in Sura by Rav (175–247) in about 220. One of the most influential Talmudic teachers, Rava (270–350), who was influenced by both Manichaean polemic and Zoroastrian theology, studied in another Talmudic academy at Pumbedita.

=== Zoroastrianism ===
The Sasanian state religion, Zoroastrianism, was largely confined to the Iranian administrative class, and did not filter down to the Assyrian-Babylonian population.

== Sources ==
- Frye, Richard (2002). "Mapping Assyria" (PDF). Ideologies as Intercultural Phenomena. Proceedings of the Third Symposium of the Melammu Project. Held in Chicago, USA, October 27-31, 2000. Milan: Università di Bologna & IsIAO. pp. 75–78. ISBN 978-8-884831-07-1.
- Gignoux, Philippe (1972). Glossaire des Inscriptions Pehlevies et Parthes [Glossary of Pahlavi and Parthians inscriptions]. Corpus Inscriptionum Iranicarum. Supplementary Series; 1 (in French). London: Lund Humphries.
- Morony, Michael G. (2005) [1984]. Iraq After The Muslim Conquest. Gorgias Press. ISBN 978-1-59333-315-7.
- Sakly, Mondher & Darley-Doran, R. (2002). "Wāsiṭ". In Bearman, P. J.; Bianquis, Th.; Bosworth, C. E.; van Donzel, E. & Heinrichs, W. P. (eds.). The Encyclopaedia of Islam, Second Edition. Volume XI: W–Z. Leiden: E. J. Brill. doi:10.1163/1573-3912_islam_COM_1343. ISBN 978-90-04-12756-2.
- Schaeder, H. H. (1997). "Sawād". In Bosworth, C. E.; van Donzel, E.; Heinrichs, W. P. & Lecomte, G. (eds.). The Encyclopaedia of Islam, Second Edition. Volume IX: San–Sze. Leiden: E. J. Brill. doi:10.1163/1573-3912_islam_SIM_6666. ISBN 978-90-04-10422-8.
- Sprengling, M. (1940). "Shahpuhr I, the Great on the Kaabah of Zoroaster (KZ)". The American Journal of Semitic Languages and Literatures. 57 (4): 341-429. ISSN 1062-0516.
- Widengren, Geo (1987). "Āsōristān". In Yarshater, Ehsan (ed.). Encyclopædia Iranica. Vol. II/8: Aśoka IV–Āṯār al-Wozarāʾ (Online ed.). Encyclopædia Iranica Foundation. pp. 785–786.
