= Guri, Sistan and Baluchestan =

Village in Sistan and Baluchestan province, Iran

Guri Persian: گوری
- Village
- Location within Iran
- Coordinates: 30°57′12″N 61°35′42″E
- Country: Iran
- Province: Sistan and Baluchestan
- County: Zehak
- District: Khamak
- Rural District: Guri

Population (2016)
  - Total: 766
- Time zone: UTC+3:30 (IRST)

Guri (Persian: گوری) is a village in, and the capital of Guri Rural District of Khamak District, Zehak County, Sistan and Baluchestan province, Iran.

== Demographics ==
=== Population ===
At the time of the 2006 National Census, the village's population was 812 in 187 households, when it was in Khamak Rural District of Jazink District. The following census in 2011 counted 843 people in 225 households. The 2016 census measured the population of the village as 766 people in 235 households.

After the census, the rural district was separated from the district in the establishment of Khamak District, and Guri was transferred to Guri Rural District created in the new district.
