= Nakao =

Nakao (written: 中尾) is a Japanese surname. Notable people with the surname include:

- Akira Nakao (born 1942), Japanese actor, TV personality and artist from Kisarazu, Chiba
- Akira Nakao (boxer) (born 1909), Japanese boxer who competed in the 1932 Summer Olympics
- Akiyoshi Nakao (中尾 明慶, born 1988), Japanese actor
- Eiichi Nakao (born 1930), Japanese politician
- Eri Nakao, Japanese voice actress
- Janine Nakao (born 1987), judoka from USA
- Jutaro Nakao (born 1970), Japanese mixed martial artist
- Koji Nakao (born 1981), former Japanese football player
- Mie Nakao (born 1946), Japanese actress and singer
- Miki Nakao (born 1978), former backstroke swimmer from Japan and Olympic medallist
- Ryūsei Nakao (born 1951), Japanese actor, voice actor and singer
- Seigo Nakao, head of Japanese Studies at Oakland University, Rochester, Michigan, United States
- Takayoshi Nakao (born 1956), former Japanese professional baseball player
- Takehiko Nakao (born 1956), Japanese civil servant, elected ninth president of the Asian Development Bank in 2013
- Tomomi Nakao (born 1981), former Japanese volleyball player who played for Ageo Medics
- Toshiyuki Nakao, professional shogi player
- Wendy Egyoku Nakao, the abbott of the Zen Center of Los Angeles
- Yoshihiro Nakao, Japanese semi-retired professional mixed martial artist
- Masaki Nakao, (born 1996), Japanese actor and entertainer

== See also ==
- Na Kaeo
- Naka (disambiguation)
- Nako (disambiguation)
- Nam khao
