= Khamak, Iran =

Khamak (Persian: خمك) in Iran may refer to:

- Khamak, Hirmand
- Khamak, Zehak
- Khamak Rural District, in Zehak County
