= Central District =

Central District may refer to:

== Places ==
- Central District (Alexandria)
- Central District (Botswana)
- Central district, Plovdiv, Bulgaria
- Central District, Xiamen, China, now Siming District, Fujian
- Central, Hong Kong, also called Central District
- List of Central Districts in Iran
- Central District (Israel)
- Central District, Riga, Latvia
- Central District, Pyongyang, North Korea
- Central District, Cabuyao, Philippines
- Central District (General Junta of Asturias constituency), Spain
- Central District, Taichung, Taiwan
- Central District (Zanzibar), Tanzania
- Central District, Seattle, United States
- Tsentralny District, Minsk, Belarus

== Other uses ==
- Central District (VHSL), a high school conference of the Virginia High School League
- Central District Football Club, an Australian rules football team

== See also ==
- Central business district
- Central Districts cricket team
- Jung District (disambiguation) (Korean for "Central District")
- Chūō-ku (disambiguation), Naka-ku (disambiguation) (Japanese for "Central District")
- Tsentralny District (disambiguation)
- Center District, Ljubljana, Slovenia
- Center District, Maribor, Slovenia
