= Naka River =

Naka River may refer to:

== 中川 ==
- Naka River (Tone River tributary) which flows through Saitama prefecture and Tokyo prefecture

== 那珂川 ==
- Naka River (Ibaraki–Tochigi) which flows through Tochigi prefecture and Ibaraki prefecture

== 那賀川 ==
- Naka River (Tokushima) which flows through Tokushima prefecture

== See also ==
- Naka (disambiguation)
