= Mohammadabad, Sefiddasht =

Village in Isfahan province, Iran

Mohammadabad Persian: محمداباد
- Village
- Location within Iran
- Coordinates: 34°06′09″N 51°22′55″E
- Country: Iran
- Province: Isfahan
- County: Aran and Bidgol
- District: Central
- Rural District: Sefiddasht

Population (2016)
  - Total: 2,125
- Time zone: UTC+3:30 (IRST)

Mohammadabad (Persian: محمداباد) (Note: Also romanized as Moḩammadābād and Mohammadābād) is a village in Sefiddasht Rural District of the Central District in Aran and Bidgol County, Isfahan province, Iran.

== Demographics ==
=== Population ===
At the time of the 2006 National Census, the village's population was 1,903 in 462 households. The following census in 2011 counted 2,169 people in 590 households. The 2016 census measured the population of the village as 2,125 people in 631 households.
