= Kadish, Iran =

Village in Isfahan province, Iran

Kadish Persian: كديش
- Village
- Location within Iran
- Coordinates: 34°13′22″N 51°24′10″E
- Country: Iran
- Province: Isfahan
- County: Aran and Bidgol
- District: Central
- Rural District: Sefiddasht

Population (2016)
  - Total: Below reporting threshold
- Time zone: UTC+3:30 (IRST)

Kadish (Persian: كديش) (Note: Also romanized as Kadīsh) is a village in Sefiddasht Rural District of the Central District in Aran and Bidgol County, Isfahan province, Iran.

== Demographics ==
=== Population ===
At the time of the 2006 National Census, the village's population was 15 in four households. The following census in 2011 counted 16 people in seven households. The 2016 census measured the population of the village as below the reporting threshold.
