= Yazdelan =

Village in Isfahan province, Iran

Yazdelan Persian: يزدلان
- Village
- Location within Iran
- Coordinates: 33°52′03″N 51°49′29″E
- Country: Iran
- Province: Isfahan
- County: Aran and Bidgol
- District: Kavirat
- Rural District: Kavir

Population (2016)
  - Total: 265
- Time zone: UTC+3:30 (IRST)

Yazdelan (Persian: يزدلان) (Note: Also romanized as Yazdelān; also known as Yazdān and Yazlān) is a village in Kavir Rural District of Kavirat District in Aran and Bidgol County, Isfahan province, Iran.

== Demographics ==
=== Population ===
At the time of the 2006 National Census, the village's population was 262 in 65 households. The following census in 2011 counted 305 people in 76 households. The 2016 census measured the population of the village as 265 people in 83 households.
