= Kheshti Castle =

Castle in Isfahan Province, Iran

Kheshti castle
- قلعه خشتی
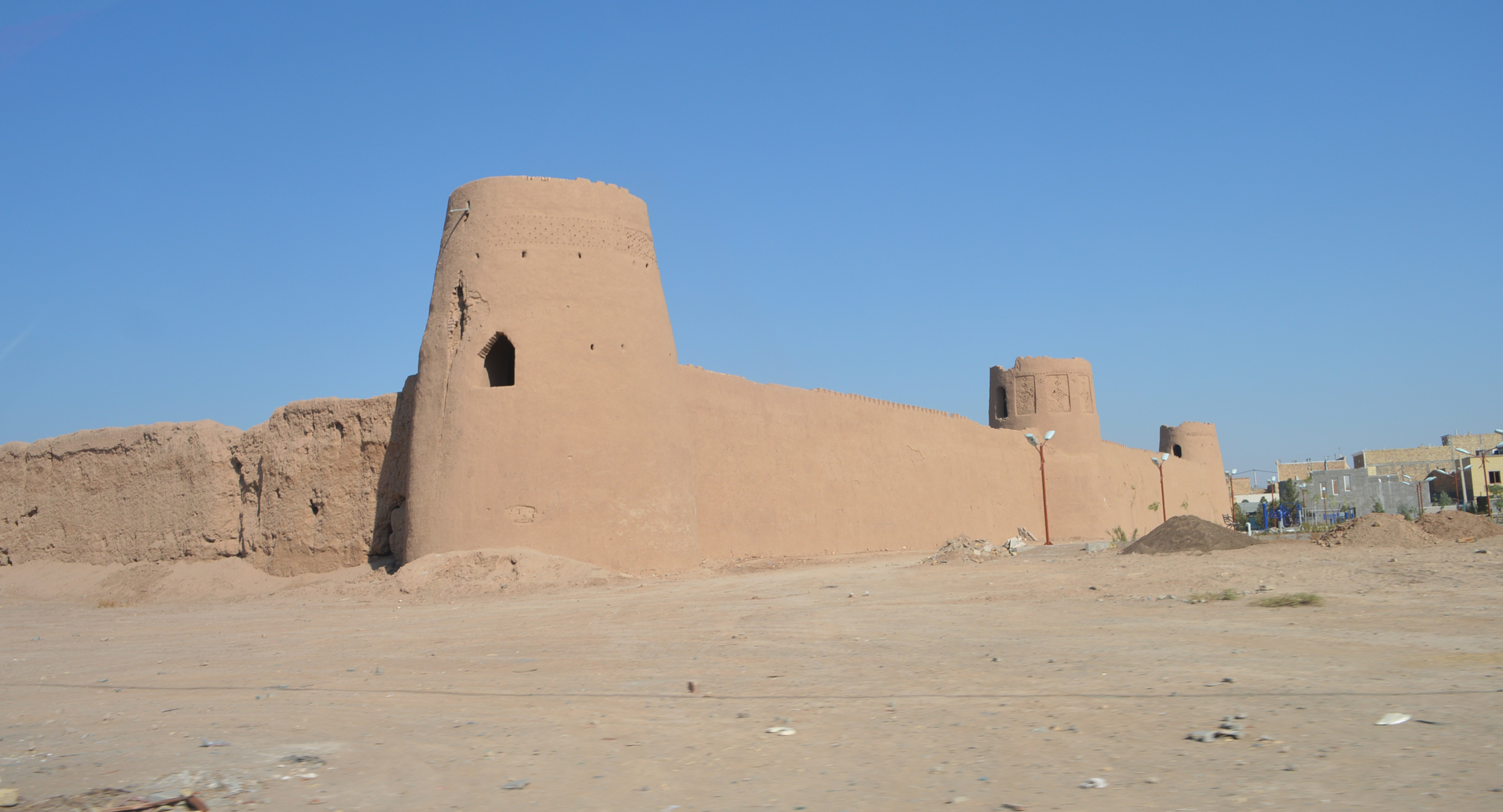
- Interactive map of the Kheshti castle area

General information
- Type: Castle
- Location: Nushabad, Iran

Kheshti castle (Persian: قلعه خشتی) Or Sizan castle (Persian: قلعه سیزان) is a historic castle located in Aran va Bidgol County, Isfahan province. The longevity of this fortress dates back to Seljuk, Timurid and Safavid eras.
