= Yazdel =

Village in Isfahan province, Iran

Yazdel Persian: يزدل
- Village
- Location within Iran
- Coordinates: 34°05′28″N 51°21′50″E
- Country: Iran
- Province: Isfahan
- County: Aran and Bidgol
- District: Central
- Rural District: Sefiddasht

Population (2016)
  - Total: 2,391
- Time zone: UTC+3:30 (IRST)

Yazdel (Persian: يزدل) (Note: Also romanized as Yazdal; also known as Yāzdiz) is a village in Sefiddasht Rural District of the Central District in Aran and Bidgol County, Isfahan province, Iran.

== Demographics ==
=== Population ===
At the time of the 2006 National Census, the village's population was 2,212 in 645 households. The following census in 2011 counted 2,387 people in 726 households. The 2016 census measured the population of the village as 2,391 people in 776 households, the most populous in its rural district.
