= 中央 =

中央 may refer to:

- Chūō (disambiguation) (Japanese: 中央)
- Zhongyang (disambiguation) (Chinese: 中央)
