= List of Central Districts in Iran =

List of various Central Districts in Iran:

- Central District (Abadan County)
- Central District (Abadeh County)
- Central District (Abarkuh County)
- Central District (Abdanan County)
- Central District (Abhar County)
- Central District (Abumusa County)
- Central District (Abyek County)
- Central District (Ahar County)
- Central District (Ahvaz County)
- Central District (Ajab Shir County)
- Central District (Alborz County)
- Central District (Aliabad County)
- Central District (Aligudarz County)
- Central District (Amlash County)
- Central District (Amol County)
- Central District (Anar County)
- Central District (Anbarabad County)
- Central District (Andika County)
- Central District (Andimeshk County)
- Central District (Aqqala County)
- Central District (Aradan County)
- Central District (Arak County)
- Central District (Aran va Bidgol County)
- Central District (Ardabil County)
- Central District (Ardakan County)
- Central District (Ardal County)
- Central District (Ardestan County)
- Central District (Arsanjan County)
- Central District (Arzuiyeh County)
- Central District (Asadabad County)
- Central District (Asaluyeh County)
- Central District (Ashtian County)
- Central District (Astaneh-ye Ashrafiyeh County)
- Central District (Astara County)
- Central District (Azadshahr County)
- Central District (Azna County)
- Central District (Babol County)
- Central District (Babolsar County)
- Central District (Bafq County)
- Central District (Baft County)
- Central District (Bagh-e Malek County)
- Central District (Bahar County)
- Central District (Baharestan County)
- Central District (Bahmai County)
- Central District (Bajestan County)
- Central District (Bakharz County)
- Central District (Bam County)
- Central District (Bampur County)
- Central District (Bandar Abbas County)
- Central District (Bandar-e Anzali County)
- Central District (Bandar-e-Gaz County)
- Central District (Bandar Lengeh County)
- Central District (Baneh County)
- Central District (Bardaskan County)
- Central District (Bardsir County)
- Central District (Bashagard County)
- Central District (Basht County)
- Central District (Bastak County)
- Central District (Bavanat County)
- Central District (Bavi County)
- Central District (Behabad County)
- Central District (Behbahan County)
- Central District (Behshahr County)
- Central District (Bijar County)
- Central District (Bileh Savar County)
- Central District (Birjand County)
- Central District (Bojnord County)
- Central District (Bonab County)
- Central District (Borkhar County)
- Central District (Borujen County)
- Central District (Borujerd County)
- Central District (Boshruyeh County)
- Central District (Bostanabad County)
- Central District (Boyer-Ahmad County)
- Central District (Buin va Miandasht County)
- Central District (Buin Zahra County)
- Central District (Bukan County)
- Central District (Bushehr County)
- Central District (Chadegan County)
- Central District (Chah Bahar County)
- Central District (Chaharbagh County)
- Central District (Chaldoran County)
- Central District (Chalus County)
- Central District (Charam County)
- Central District (Charuymaq County)
- Central District (Chaypareh County)
- Central District (Chenaran County)
- Central District (Dalahu County)
- Central District (Dalgan County)
- Central District (Damavand County)
- Central District (Damghan County)
- Central District (Dana County)
- Central District (Darab County)
- Central District (Dargaz County)
- Central District (Darmian County)
- Central District (Darreh Shahr County)
- Central District (Dasht-e Azadegan County)
- Central District (Dashtestan County)
- Central District (Dashti County)
- Central District (Dehaqan County)
- Central District (Dehgolan County)
- Central District (Dehloran County)
- Central District (Delfan County)
- Central District (Delijan County)
- Central District (Deylam County)
- Central District (Deyr County)
- Central District (Dezful County)
- Central District (Divandarreh County)
- Central District (Dorud County)
- Central District (Eqlid County)
- Central District (Esfarayen County)
- Central District (Eslamabad-e Gharb County)
- Central District (Eslamshahr County)
- Central District (Estahban County)
- Central District (Eshtehard County)
- Central District (Eyvan County)
- Central District (Fahraj County)
- Central District (Falavarjan County)
- Central District (Famenin County)
- Central District (Farahan County)
- Central District (Farashband County)
- Central District (Fardis County)
- Central District (Faridan County)
- Central District (Fariman County)
- Central District (Farsan County)
- Central District (Faruj County)
- Central District (Faryab County)
- Central District (Fasa County)
- Central District (Ferdows County)
- Central District (Fereydunkenar County)
- Central District (Fereydunshahr County)
- Central District (Firuzabad County)
- Central District (Firuzeh County)
- Central District (Firuzkuh County)
- Central District (Fuman County)
- Central District (Gachsaran County)
- Central District (Galugah County)
- Central District (Ganaveh County)
- Central District (Garmsar County)
- Central District (Gerash County)
- Central District (Germi County)
- Central District (Ghayen County)
- Central District (Gilan-e Gharb County)
- Central District (Golpayegan County)
- Central District (Gonabad County)
- Central District (Gonbad-e-Qabus County)
- Central District (Gorgan County)
- Central District (Gotvand County)
- Central District (Haftgel County)
- Central District (Hajjiabad County)
- Central District (Hamadan County)
- Central District (Harsin County)
- Central District (Hashtrud County)
- Central District (Hendijan County)
- Central District (Heris County)
- Central District (Hirmand County)
- Central District (Hoveyzeh County)
- Central District (Ijrud County)
- Central District (Ilam County)
- Central District (Iranshahr County)
- Central District (Isfahan County)
- Central District (Izeh County)
- Central District (Jahrom County)
- Central District (Jajrom County)
- Central District (Jam County)
- Central District (Jask County)
- Central District (Javanrud County)
- Central District (Jiroft County)
- Central District (Joghatai County)
- Central District (Jolfa County)
- Central District (Jowayin County)
- Central District (Juybar County)
- Central District (Kabudarahang County)
- Central District (Kahnuj County)
- Central District (Kalaleh County)
- Central District (Kalat County)
- Central District (Kaleybar County)
- Central District (Kamyaran County)
- Central District (Kangan County)
- Central District (Kangavar County)
- Central District (Karaj County)
- Central District (Karun County)
- Central District (Kashan County)
- Central District (Kashmar County)
- Central District (Kavar County)
- Central District (Kazerun County)
- Central District (Kerman County)
- Central District (Kermanshah County)
- Central District (Khalilabad County)
- Central District (Khalkhal County)
- Central District (Khamir County)
- Central District (Khash County)
- Central District (Khatam County)
- Central District (Khoda Afarin County)
- Central District (Khodabandeh County)
- Central District (Khomeyn County)
- Central District (Khomeyni Shahr County)
- Central District (Khondab County)
- Central District (Khonj County)
- Central District (Khorramabad County)
- Central District (Khorrambid County)
- Central District (Khorramdarreh County)
- Central District (Khorramshahr County)
- Central District (Khoshab County)
- Central District (Khoy County)
- Central District (Khur and Biabanak County)
- Central District (Khvaf County)
- Central District (Khvansar County)
- Central District (Kiar County)
- Central District (Kohgiluyeh County)
- Central District (Komijan County)
- Central District (Konarak County)
- Central District (Kordkuy County)
- Central District (Kowsar County)
- Central District (Kuhbanan County)
- Central District (Kuhdasht County)
- Central District (Kuhrang County)
- Central District (Lahijan County)
- Central District (Lali County)
- Central District (Lamerd County)
- Central District (Langarud County)
- Central District (Larestan County)
- Central District (Lenjan County)
- Central District (Lordegan County)
- Central District (Mahabad County)
- Central District (Mahallat County)
- Central District (Mahmudabad County)
- Central District (Mahneshan County)
- Central District (Mahshahr County)
- Central District (Mahvelat County)
- Central District (Maku County)
- Central District (Malard County)
- Central District (Malayer County)
- Central District (Malekan County)
- Central District (Malekshahi County)
- Central District (Mamasani County)
- Central District (Maneh-o-Samalqan County)
- Central District (Manujan County)
- Central District (Maragheh County)
- Central District (Marand County)
- Central District (Maraveh Tappeh County)
- Central District (Marivan County)
- Central District (Marvdasht County)
- Central District (Masal County)
- Central District (Mashhad County)
- Central District (Masjed Soleyman County)
- Central District (Mehdishahr County)
- Central District (Mehran County)
- Central District (Mehrestan County)
- Central District (Mehriz County)
- Central District (Meshgin Shahr County)
- Central District (Meyami County)
- Central District (Meyaneh County)
- Central District (Meybod County)
- Central District (Miandoab County)
- Central District (Miandorud County)
- Central District (Minab County)
- Central District (Minudasht County)
- Central District (Mirjaveh County)
- Central District (Mobarakeh County)
- Central District (Mohr County)
- Central District (Nahavand County)
- Central District (Nain County)
- Central District (Najafabad County)
- Central District (Namin County)
- Central District (Naqadeh County)
- Central District (Narmashir County)
- Central District (Natanz County)
- Central District (Nazarabad County)
- Central District (Nehbandan County)
- Central District (Neka County)
- Central District (Neyriz County)
- Central District (Nik Shahr County)
- Central District (Nir County)
- Central District (Nishapur County)
- Central District (Nowshahr County)
- Central District (Nur County)
- Central District (Omidiyeh County)
- Central District (Oshnavieh County)
- Central District (Osku County)
- Central District (Pakdasht County)
- Central District (Pardis County)
- Central District (Parsabad County)
- Central District (Parsian County)
- Central District (Pasargad County)
- Central District (Paveh County)
- Central District (Piranshahr County)
- Central District (Pishva County)
- Central District (Pol-e Dokhtar County)
- Central District (Poldasht County)
- Central District (Qaem Shahr County)
- Central District (Qaleh Ganj County)
- Central District (Qarchak County)
- Central District (Qasr-e Qand County)
- Central District (Qasr-e Shirin County)
- Central District (Qazvin County)
- Central District (Qeshm County)
- Central District (Qir and Karzin County)
- Central District (Qods County)
- Central District (Qom County)
- Central District (Qorveh County)
- Central District (Quchan County)
- Central District (Rabor County)
- Central District (Rafsanjan County)
- Central District (Ramhormoz County)
- Central District (Ramian County)
- Central District (Ramsar County)
- Central District (Ramshir County)
- Central District (Rasht County)
- Central District (Rashtkhvar County)
- Central District (Ravansar County)
- Central District (Ravar County)
- Central District (Razan County)
- Central District (Rey County)
- Central District (Rezvanshahr County)
- Central District (Rigan County)
- Central District (Robat Karim County)
- Central District (Rostam County)
- Central District (Rudan County)
- Central District (Rudbar County)
- Central District (Rudbar Jonubi County)
- Central District (Rudsar County)
- Central District (Sabzevar County)
- Central District (Saduq County)
- Central District (Sahneh County)
- Central District (Salas-e Babajani County)
- Central District (Salmas County)
- Central District (Sanandaj County)
- Central District (Saqqez County)
- Central District (Sarab County)
- Central District (Sarakhs County)
- Central District (Saravan County)
- Central District (Sarayan County)
- Central District (Sarbaz County)
- Central District (Sarbisheh County)
- Central District (Sardasht County)
- Central District (Sareyn County)
- Central District (Sari County)
- Central District (Sarpol-e Zahab County)
- Central District (Sarvabad County)
- Central District (Sarvestan County)
- Central District (Savadkuh County)
- Central District (Saveh County)
- Central District (Savojbolagh County)
- Central District (Selseleh County)
- Central District (Semirom County)
- Central District (Semnan County)
- Central District (Sepidan County)
- Central District (Shabestar County)
- Central District (Shadegan County)
- Central District (Shaft County)
- Central District (Shahin Dezh County)
- Central District (Shahin Shahr and Meymeh County)
- Central District (Shahr-e Babak County)
- Central District (Shahrekord County)
- Central District (Shahreza County)
- Central District (Shahriar County)
- Central District (Shahrud County)
- Central District (Shazand County)
- Central District (Shiraz County)
- Central District (Shirvan and Chardaval County)
- Central District (Shirvan County)
- Central District (Shush County)
- Central District (Shushtar County)
- Central District (Siahkal County)
- Central District (Sib and Suran County)
- Central District (Simorgh County)
- Central District (Sirjan County)
- Central District (Sonqor County)
- Central District (Sorkheh County)
- Central District (Sowme'eh Sara County)
- Central District (Tabas County)
- Central District (Tabriz County)
- Central District (Tafresh County)
- Central District (Taft County)
- Central District (Takab County)
- Central District (Takestan County)
- Central District (Taleqan County)
- Central District (Talesh County)
- Central District (Tangestan County)
- Central District (Tarom County)
- Central District (Taybad County)
- Central District (Tehran County)
- Central District (Tiran and Karun County)
- Central District (Tonekabon County)
- Central District (Torbat-e-Heydarieh County)
- Central District (Torbat-e-Jam County)
- Central District (Torkaman County)
- Central District (Tuyserkan County)
- Central District (Urmia County)
- Central District (Varamin County)
- Central District (Varzaqan County)
- Central District (Yazd County)
- Central District (Zabol County)
- Central District (Zahedan County)
- Central District (Zanjan County)
- Central District (Zarand County)
- Central District (Zarandieh County)
- Central District (Zarrin Dasht County)
- Central District (Zaveh County)
- Central District (Zehak County)
- Central District (Zirkuh County)

== See also ==
- Central District (disambiguation)
