= Qasemabad, Aran and Bidgol =

Village in Isfahan province, Iran

Qasemabad Persian: قاسم اباد
- Village
- Location within Iran
- Coordinates: 33°52′11″N 51°50′12″E
- Country: Iran
- Province: Isfahan
- County: Aran and Bidgol
- District: Kavirat
- Rural District: Kavir

Population (2016)
  - Total: 590
- Time zone: UTC+3:30 (IRST)

Qasemabad (Persian: قاسم اباد) (Note: Also romanized as Qāsemābād) is a village in Kavir Rural District of Kavirat District in Aran and Bidgol County, Isfahan province, Iran.

== Demographics ==
=== Population ===
At the time of the 2006 National Census, the village's population was 554 in 141 households. The following census in 2011 counted 958 people in 286 households. The 2016 census measured the population of the village as 590 people in 199 households.
