= Khvajeh Ahmad =

Village in Sistan and Baluchestan province, Iran

Khvajeh Ahmad Persian: خواجه احمد
- Village
- Location within Iran
- Coordinates: 30°51′35″N 61°44′48″E
- Country: Iran
- Province: Sistan and Baluchestan
- County: Zehak
- District: Central
- Rural District: Khvajeh Ahmad

Population (2016)
  - Total: 969
- Time zone: UTC+3:30 (IRST)

Khvajeh Ahmad (Persian: خواجه احمد) is a village in, and the capital of, Khvajeh Ahmad Rural District of the Central District of Zehak County, Sistan and Baluchestan province, Iran.

== Demographics ==
=== Population ===
At the time of the 2006 National Census, the village's population was 1,060 in 224 households. The following census in 2011 counted 1,099 people in 276 households. The 2016 census measured the population of the village as 969 people in 266 households.
