= Hoseynabad, Kavirat =

Village in Isfahan province, Iran

Hoseynabad Persian: حسين اباد
- Village
- Location within Iran
- Coordinates: 33°50′08″N 51°52′26″E
- Country: Iran
- Province: Isfahan
- County: Aran and Bidgol
- District: Kavirat
- Rural District: Kavir

Population (2016)
  - Total: 1,743
- Time zone: UTC+3:30 (IRST)

Hoseynabad (Persian: حسين اباد) (Note: Also romanized as Ḩoseynābād; also known as Ḩasanābād, Ḩoseynābād Sheybānī-ye Kavīr, and Husainābād) is a village in, and the capital of, Kavir Rural District in Kavirat District of Aran and Bidgol County, Isfahan province, Iran.

== Demographics ==
=== Population ===
At the time of the 2006 National Census, the village's population was 1,686 in 440 households. The following census in 2011 counted 1,770 people in 512 households. The 2016 census measured the population of the village as 1,743 people in 571 households, the most populous in its rural district.
