= Amir Nezam =

Village in Sistan and Baluchestan province, Iran

Amir Nezam Persian: امیرنظام
- Village
- Location within Iran
- Coordinates: 30°50′54″N 61°45′16″E
- Country: Iran
- Province: Sistan and Baluchestan
- County: Zehak
- District: Central
- Rural District: Khvajeh Ahmad

Population (2016)
  - Total: 2,385
- Time zone: UTC+3:30 (IRST)

Amir Nezam (Persian: امیرنظام) is a village in Khvajeh Ahmad Rural District of the Central District of Zehak County, Sistan and Baluchestan province, Iran.

== Demographics ==
=== Population ===
At the time of the 2006 National Census, the village's population was 2,272 in 450 households. The following census in 2011 counted 2,348 people in 510 households. The 2016 census measured the population of the village as 2,385 people in 634 households. It was the most populous village in its rural district.
