= Majdabad, Isfahan =

Village in Isfahan province, Iran

Majdabad Persian: مجداباد
- Village
- Location within Iran
- Coordinates: 34°04′29″N 51°29′59″E
- Country: Iran
- Province: Isfahan
- County: Aran and Bidgol
- District: Central
- Rural District: Sefiddasht

Population (2016)
  - Total: Below reporting threshold
- Time zone: UTC+3:30 (IRST)

Majdabad (Persian: مجداباد) (Note: Also romanized as Majdābād) is a village in Sefiddasht Rural District of the Central District in Aran and Bidgol County, Isfahan province, Iran.

== Demographics ==
=== Population ===
At the time of the 2006 National Census, the village's population was 14 in five households. The village did not appear in the following census of 2011. The 2016 census measured the population of the village as below the reporting threshold.
