= Dasht-e Anqolab =

Village in Isfahan province, Iran

Dasht-e Anqolab Persian: دشت انقلاب
- Village
- Country: Iran
- Province: Isfahan
- County: Aran and Bidgol
- District: Kavirat
- Rural District: Kavirat

Population (2016)
  - Total: 27
- Time zone: UTC+3:30 (IRST)

Dasht-e Anqolab (Persian: دشت انقلاب) (Note: Also romanized as Dasht-e Ānqolāb, Dasht-e Enqolab, and Dasht-e Enqolāb) is a village in Kavirat Rural District of Kavirat District in Aran and Bidgol County, Isfahan province, Iran.

== Demographics ==
=== Population ===
At the time of the 2006 National Census, the village's population was 11 in four households. The following census in 2011 counted 74 people in 21 households. The 2016 census recorded a population of 27 people in nine households.
