= Karshahi Castle =

Castle in Isfahan Province, Iran

- قلعه کرشاهی
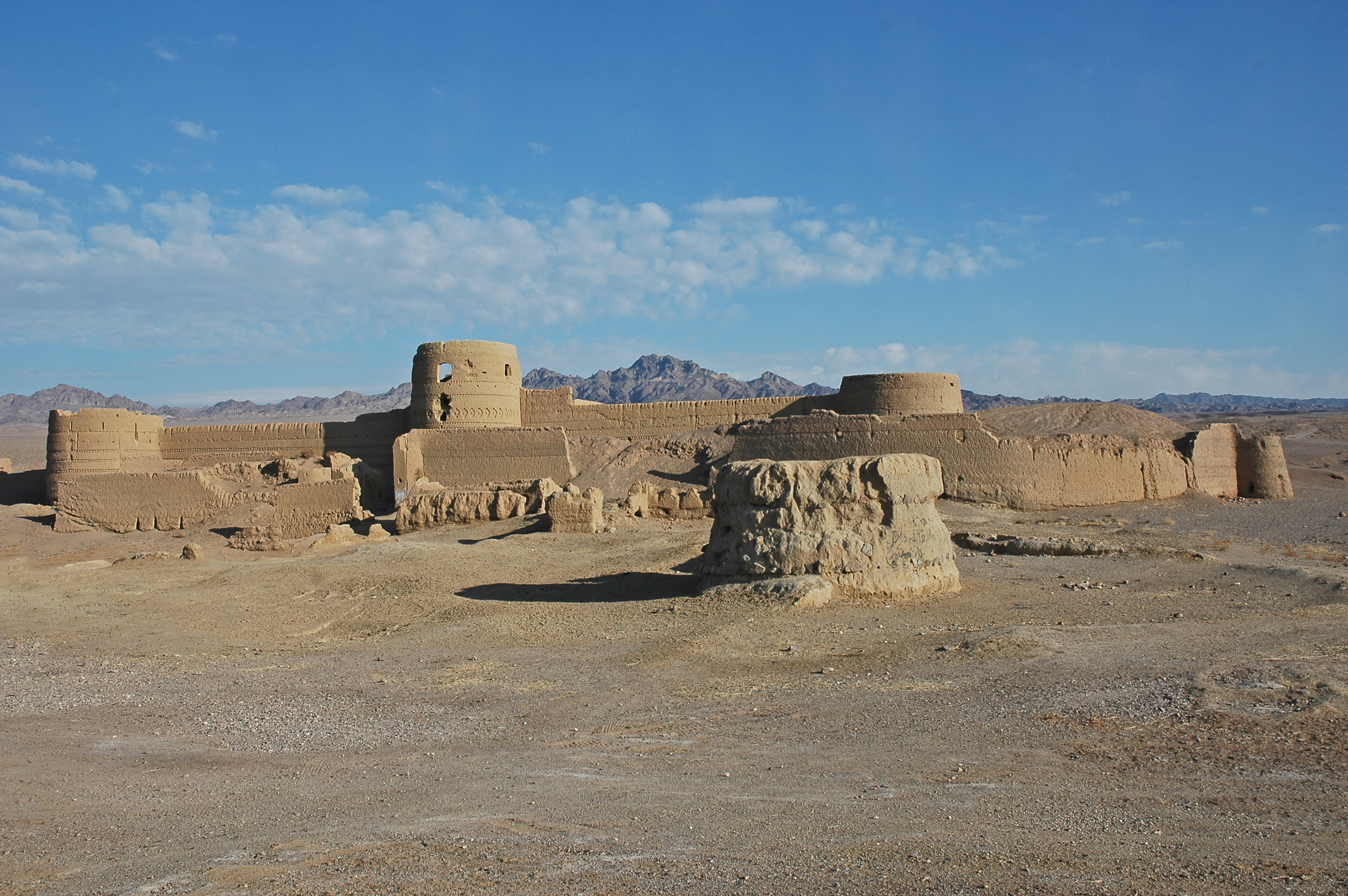
- Interactive map of the Karshahi Castle area

General information
- Type: Castle
- Location: Abuzeydabad, Iran

Karshahi Castle (Persian: قلعه کرشاهی) is a Sasanian era historic castle in Aran va Bidgol County, Isfahan province.
