= Mohammadabad, Kavirat =

Village in Isfahan province, Iran

Mohammadabad Persian: محمداباد
- Village
- Location within Iran
- Coordinates: 33°52′55″N 51°45′33″E
- Country: Iran
- Province: Isfahan
- County: Aran and Bidgol
- District: Kavirat
- Rural District: Kavirat

Population (2016)
  - Total: 2,104
- Time zone: UTC+3:30 (IRST)

Mohammadabad (Persian: محمداباد) (Note: Also romanized as Moḩammadābād; also known as Moḩammadābād-e Moḩammadī and Muhammadābād) is a village in Kavirat Rural District of Kavirat District in Aran and Bidgol County, Isfahan province, Iran.

== Demographics ==
=== Population ===
At the time of the 2006 National Census, the village's population was 1,849 in 484 households. The following census in 2011 counted 1,999 people in 583 households. The 2016 census recorded a population of 2,104 people in 665 households, the most populous in its rural district.
