= Aliabad-e Kavir =

Village in Isfahan province, Iran

Aliabad-e Kavir Persian: علي ابادكوير
- Village
- Location within Iran
- Coordinates: 34°05′49″N 51°23′08″E
- Country: Iran
- Province: Isfahan
- County: Aran and Bidgol
- District: Central
- Rural District: Sefiddasht

Population (2016)
  - Total: 1,375
- Time zone: UTC+3:30 (IRST)

Aliabad-e Kavir (Persian: علي ابادكوير) (Note: Also romanized as ‘Alīābād-e Kavīr; also known as ‘Alīābād) is a village in Sefiddasht Rural District of the Central District in Aran and Bidgol County, Isfahan province, Iran.

== Demographics ==
=== Population ===
At the time of the 2006 National Census, the village's population was 1,330 in 339 households. The following census in 2011 counted 1,513 people in 426 households. The 2016 census measured the population of the village as 1,375 people in 412 households.
