= Chale Sonbak Desert =

Desert in Iran

Coordinates: 34°11′N 51°08′E

The Chale Sonbak Desert is located in south-west of Maranjab Desert, Iran and around north of Abuzeydabad.
