= Fakhreh =

Village in Isfahan province, Iran

Fakhreh Persian: فخره
- Village
- Location within Iran
- Coordinates: 33°55′24″N 51°40′52″E
- Country: Iran
- Province: Isfahan
- County: Aran and Bidgol
- District: Kavirat
- Rural District: Kavirat

Population (2016)
  - Total: 490
- Time zone: UTC+3:30 (IRST)

Fakhreh (Persian: فخره) (Note: Also known as Fakhrābād) is a village in Kavirat Rural District of Kavirat District in Aran and Bidgol County, Isfahan province, Iran.

== Demographics ==
=== Population ===
At the time of the 2006 National Census, the village's population was 445 in 103 households. The following census in 2011 counted 412 people in 120 households. The 2016 census recorded a population of 490 people in 143 households.
