= Guri Rural District =

Rural district in Sistan and Baluchestan province, Iran

Guri Rural District Persian: دهستان گوری
- Rural District
- Location within Iran
- Coordinates: 30°57′05″N 61°35′52″E
- Country: Iran
- Province: Sistan and Baluchestan
- County: Zehak
- District: Khamak
- Capital: Guri
- Time zone: UTC+3:30 (IRST)

Guri Rural District (Persian: دهستان گوری) is in Khamak District of Zehak County, Sistan and Baluchestan province, Iran. Its capital is the village of Guri, whose population at the time of the 2016 National Census was 766 people in 235 households.

== History ==
After the census, Khamak Rural District was separated from Jazink District in the formation of Khamak District, and Guri Rural District was created in the new district.
