= Kavirat =

Kavirat (Persian: کویرات) may refer to:

- Kavirat District
- Kavirat Rural District (disambiguation)
