= Shahrak-e Kuhak =

Village in Sistan and Baluchestan province, Iran

Shahrak-e Kuhak Persian: شهرک کوهک
- Village
- Location within Iran
- Coordinates: 30°50′53″N 61°44′01″E
- Country: Iran
- Province: Sistan and Baluchestan
- County: Zehak
- District: Central
- Rural District: Zehak

Population (2016)
  - Total: 4,903
- Time zone: UTC+3:30 (IRST)

Shahrak-e Kuhak (Persian: شهرک کوهک) is a village in Zehak Rural District of the Central District of Zehak County, Sistan and Baluchestan province, Iran.

== Demographics ==
=== Population ===
At the time of the 2006 National Census, the village's population was 5,136 in 976 households. The following census in 2011 counted 5,904 people in 1,284 households. The 2016 census measured the population of the village as 4,903 people in 1,250 households. It was the most populous village in its rural district.
