= Kaghazi, Isfahan =

Village in Isfahan province, Iran

Kaghazi Persian: كاغذي
- Village
- Location within Iran
- Coordinates: 33°53′51″N 51°47′05″E
- Country: Iran
- Province: Isfahan
- County: Aran and Bidgol
- District: Kavirat
- Rural District: Kavir

Population (2016)
  - Total: 1,708
- Time zone: UTC+3:30 (IRST)

Kaghazi (Persian: كاغذي) (Note: Also romanized as Kāghaz̄ī and Kāghazī; also known as Khakūzā, Khakūzeh, and Mazra‘eh-ye Kāghazī) is a village in Kavir Rural District of Kavirat District in Aran and Bidgol County, Isfahan province, Iran.

== Demographics ==
=== Population ===
At the time of the 2006 National Census, the village's population was 1,490 in 408 households. The following census in 2011 counted 1,620 people in 480 households. The 2016 census measured the population of the village as 1,708 people in 534 households.
