= Qaleh Now, Zehak =

Village in Sistan and Baluchestan province, Iran

Qaleh Now Persian: قلعه‌نو
- Village
- Location within Iran
- Coordinates: 30°49′40″N 61°38′17″E
- Country: Iran
- Province: Sistan and Baluchestan
- County: Zehak
- District: Jazink
- Rural District: Qaleh Now

Population (2016)
  - Total: 1,353
- Time zone: UTC+3:30 (IRST)

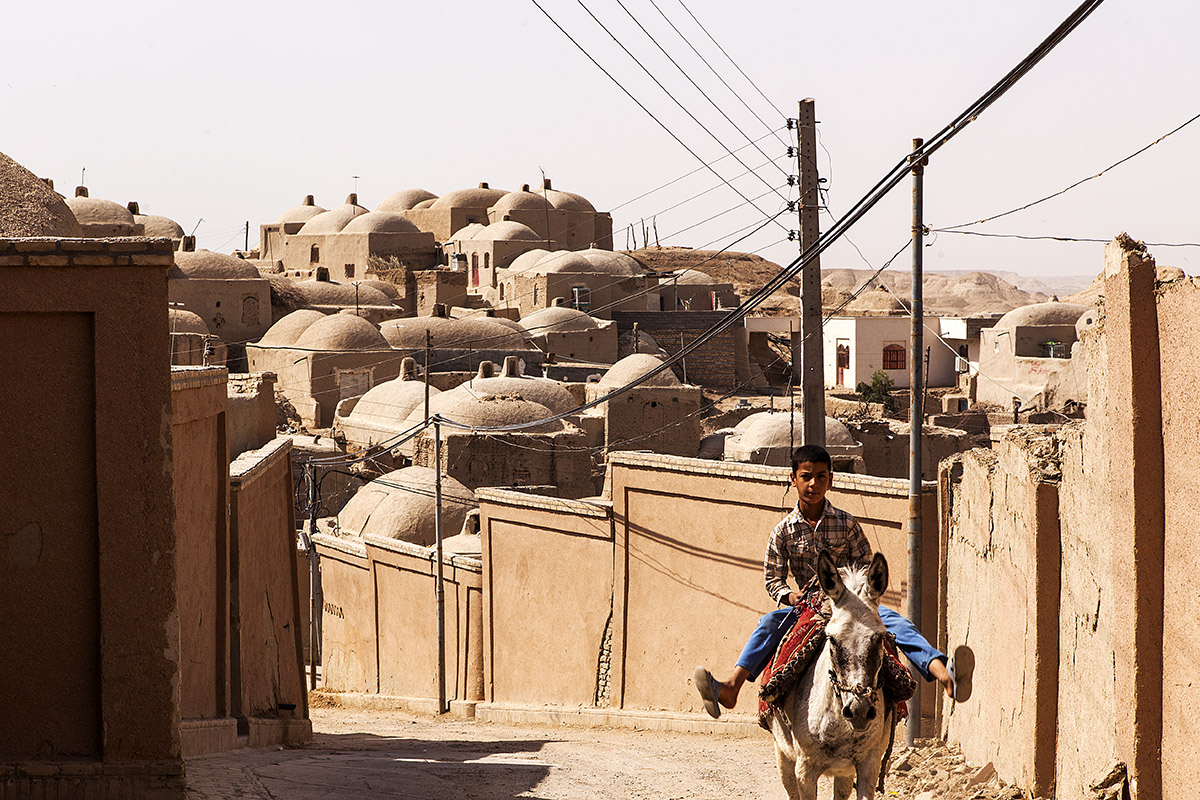
Qaleh Now in 2018

Qaleh Now (Persian: قلعه‌نو) is a village in, and the capital of Qaleh Now Rural District of Jazink District, Zehak County, Sistan and Baluchestan province, Iran.

== Demographics ==
=== Population ===
At the time of the 2006 National Census, the village's population was 1,189 in 271 households, when it was in Jazink Rural District. The following census in 2011 counted 1,213 people in 295 households. The 2016 census measured the population of the village as 1,353 people in 358 households. It was the most populous village in its rural district.

After the census, the village was transferred to Qaleh Now Rural District created in the district.
