= Fatemeh Hamami =

Iranian foot-and-mouth painter (born 1989)

Fatemeh Hamami Nasrabadi
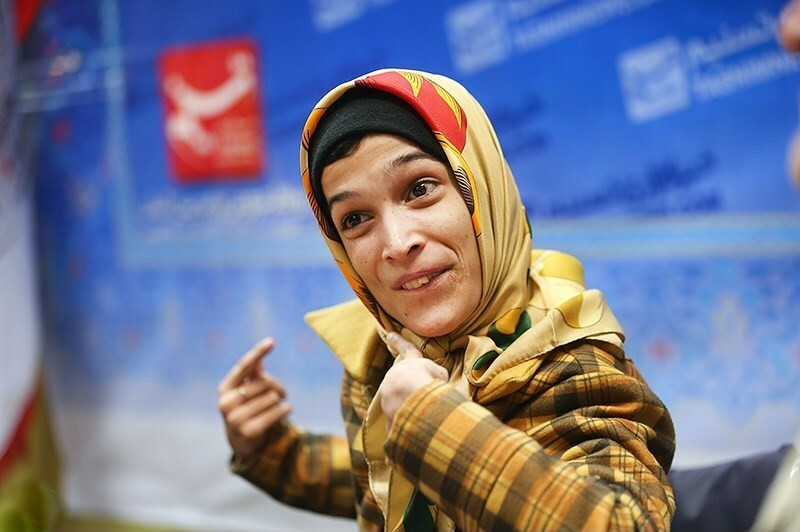
- Hamami
- Born: 1 February 1989; Sefidshahr, Aran o Bidgol, Iran
- Occupation: Painter
- Known for: Drawing famous person portraits including Lionel Messi and Cristiano Ronaldo portraits

Fatemeh Hamami Nasrabadi (born February 1, 1989, in Sefidshahr, Aran o Bidgol) is a painter from Iran. Due to her physical disability, she has painted pictures of football players with her feet.

Fatemeh Hamami participated in the first Homam Festival and won a Gold Plaque for her outstanding work in visual arts. The event took place on Monday, December 23, 2019, at the Ivan Shams Hall.

In 2023, she made two portraits of Portuguese soccer player Cristiano Ronaldo, and met him in Iran when he travelled with the Saudi Arabian football team Al-Nassr FC.
