= Murchan Castle =

Castle in Isfahan Province, Iran

- قلعه مورچان

General information
- Type: Castle
- Location: Aran va Bidgol County, Iran

Murchan Castle (Persian: قلعه مورچان) is a historical castle located in Aran va Bidgol County in Isfahan Province, The longevity of this fortress dates back to the Buyid dynasty.
