= Khamak, Zehak =

Village in Sistan and Baluchestan province, Iran

Khamak Persian: خمک
- Village
- Location within Iran
- Coordinates: 30°55′25″N 61°37′23″E
- Country: Iran
- Province: Sistan and Baluchestan
- County: Zehak
- District: Khamak
- Rural District: Khamak

Population (2016)
  - Total: 1,542
- Time zone: UTC+3:30 (IRST)

Khamak (Persian: خمک) is a village in Khamak Rural District of Khamak District, Zehak County, Sistan and Baluchestan province, Iran, serving as capital of both the district and the rural district.

== Demographics ==
=== Population ===
At the time of the 2006 National Census, the village's population was 1,263 in 324 households, when it was in Jazink District. The following census in 2011 counted 1,439 people in 390 households. The 2016 census measured the population of the village as 1,542 people in 464 households. It was the most populous village in its rural district.

After the census, the rural district was separated from the district in the formation of Khamak District.
