= Maranjab Caravansarai =

UNESCO World Heritage Site in Iran

Coordinates: 34.2991°N 51.8124°E

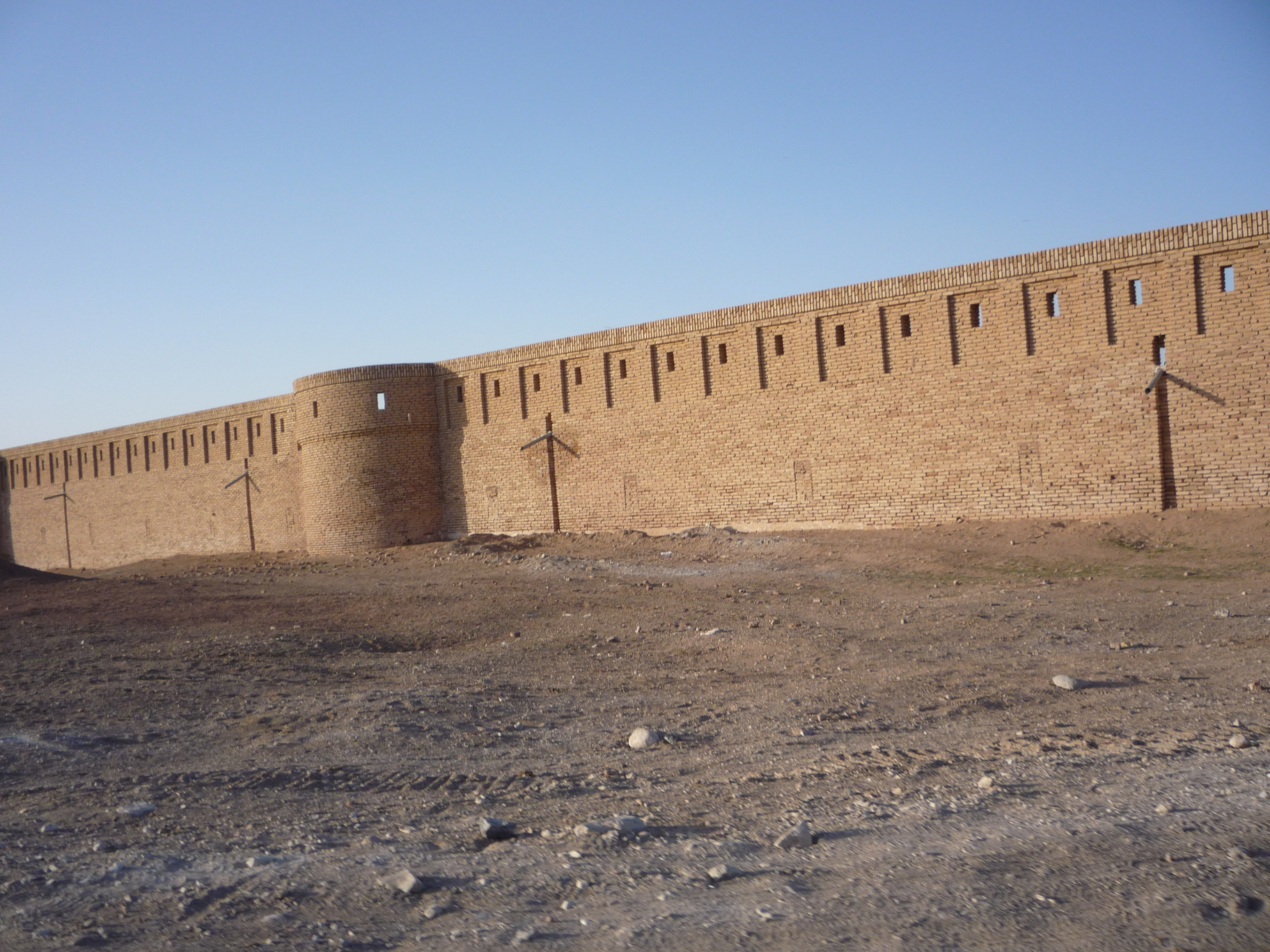
Maranjab Caravansarai

The Maranjab Caravansarai (Persian: کاروانسرای مرنجاب) is a Safavid era caravanserai in the Maranjab Desert, located to the north of the city of Aran and Bidgol in Isfahan province, Iran. In 1603, it was constructed by the order of Abbas the Great along the Silk Road between Khorasan and Isfahan provinces.

== History ==
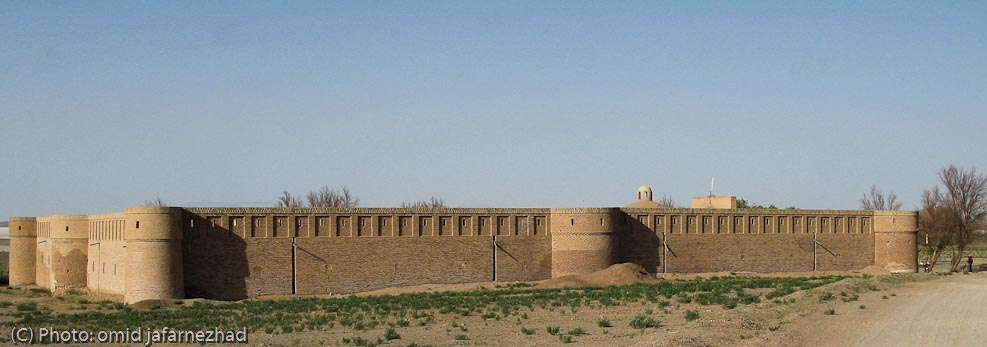
Maranjab Caravansarai

Constructed along the Silk Road in 1603, the caravanserai was used by travelers from China and Europe for many years. It was also used as a fortress, with 500 soldiers to protect travelers against bandits and to fight against possible military attacks from countries to the east, such as Afghanistan and Uzbekistan.

In 2000, Iran's historical heritage association instituted a project to repair the building, which continued until 2004. Since then it has been used as a tourist attraction.

== Structure ==
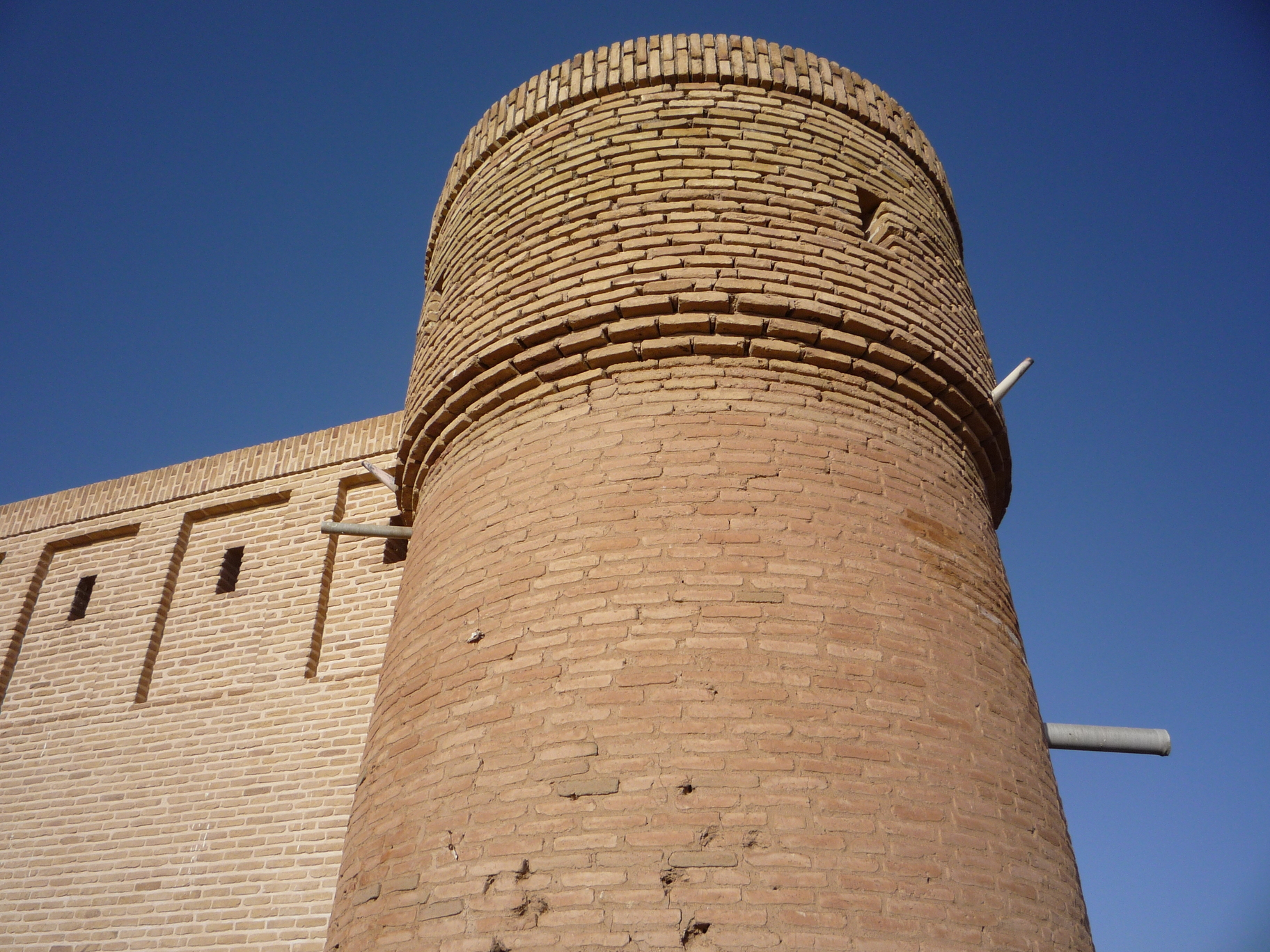
Watchtower

The 3,500-square-metre (38,000 sq ft) rectangular building has 29 rooms and is totally made of bricks.

The fortified exterior walls have six watchtowers for archers and scout troops.

== Tourist attraction ==
Being in the middle of a desert, the caravanserai attracts numerous desert lovers. The main tourist attractions of the area are off-road driving, astronomy and camel riding.
