= Nushabad =

City in Isfahan province, Iran

Nushabad Persian: نوش آباد
- City
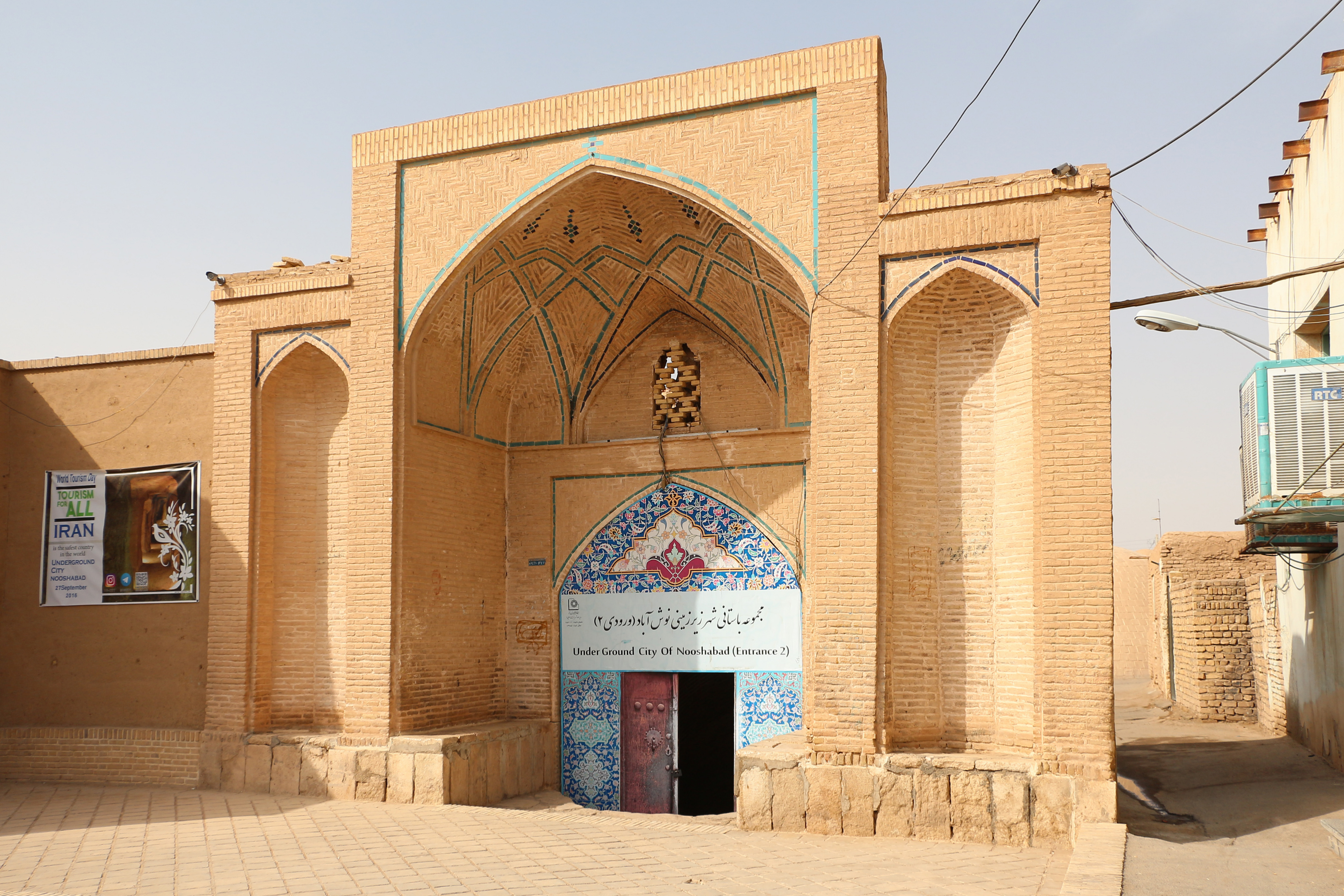
- Entrance to the underground city

- Location within Iran
- Coordinates: 34°04′47″N 51°26′09″E
- Country: Iran
- Province: Isfahan
- County: Aran and Bidgol
- District: Central

Population (2016)
  - Total: 11,838
- Time zone: UTC+3:30 (IRST)

Nushabad (Persian: نوش آباد) (Note: Also romanized as Nūshābād; also known as Noshābād) is a city in the Central District of Aran and Bidgol County, Isfahan province, Iran.

== Demographics ==
=== Population ===
At the time of the 2006 National Census, the city's population was 10,476 in 2,859 households. The following census in 2011 counted 10,904 people in 3,266 households. The 2016 census measured the population of the city as 11,838 people in 3,707 households.

== Underground city ==
The underground city of Ouyi (Noushabad), located 3 km (1.9 mi) north of Aran o bidgol, Isfahan province, is considered notable ancient architecture. As Noushabad city is located in the central desert region of Iran, it experiences harsh weather. During the day, it is very hot, and during the nights it is cold.

The city's name Noushabad ('city of cold tasty water') originated in ancient times when a Sassanian king traveled there, and upon drinking water from a local well, found it especially clear and cold. He ordered the building of a city around this well and named it Anoushabad, which eventually turned into Noushabad.

One reason for this underground city being built is thought to be to offer an escape from the high daytime temperature of the region. However the main reason that the underground city of Noushabad was carved stemmed from the fact that in the past, this region was insecure, suffering from raids, and by forming an underground chain of passages beneath the entire city, the inhabitants could shelter there during such attacks. Through these passages they could reach any spot in the city without being seen.

The depth of this underground city varies from 4 to 18 m (13 to 59 ft). To reach the underground city, there were several different openings. Some of these openings were located inside the houses of people and others were located in important gathering places, such as the main fort just outside the city. People could live in the underground passages for several days without the need of to go outside.

There are three levels in this underground city, planned in such a way that going to the different levels required moving from down to up. This made it easier for the people sheltering in the underground city to prevent enemies from getting to the upper levels. Another interesting feature of their architecture was the curvy passages that made it possible for the inhabitants to ambush enemies. Furthermore, there were several other tricks that were used to resist against the enemies, for instance digging deep holes in the middle of the rooms and covering them with rotating stones that would fall down if anyone stepped on them.

== Gallery ==
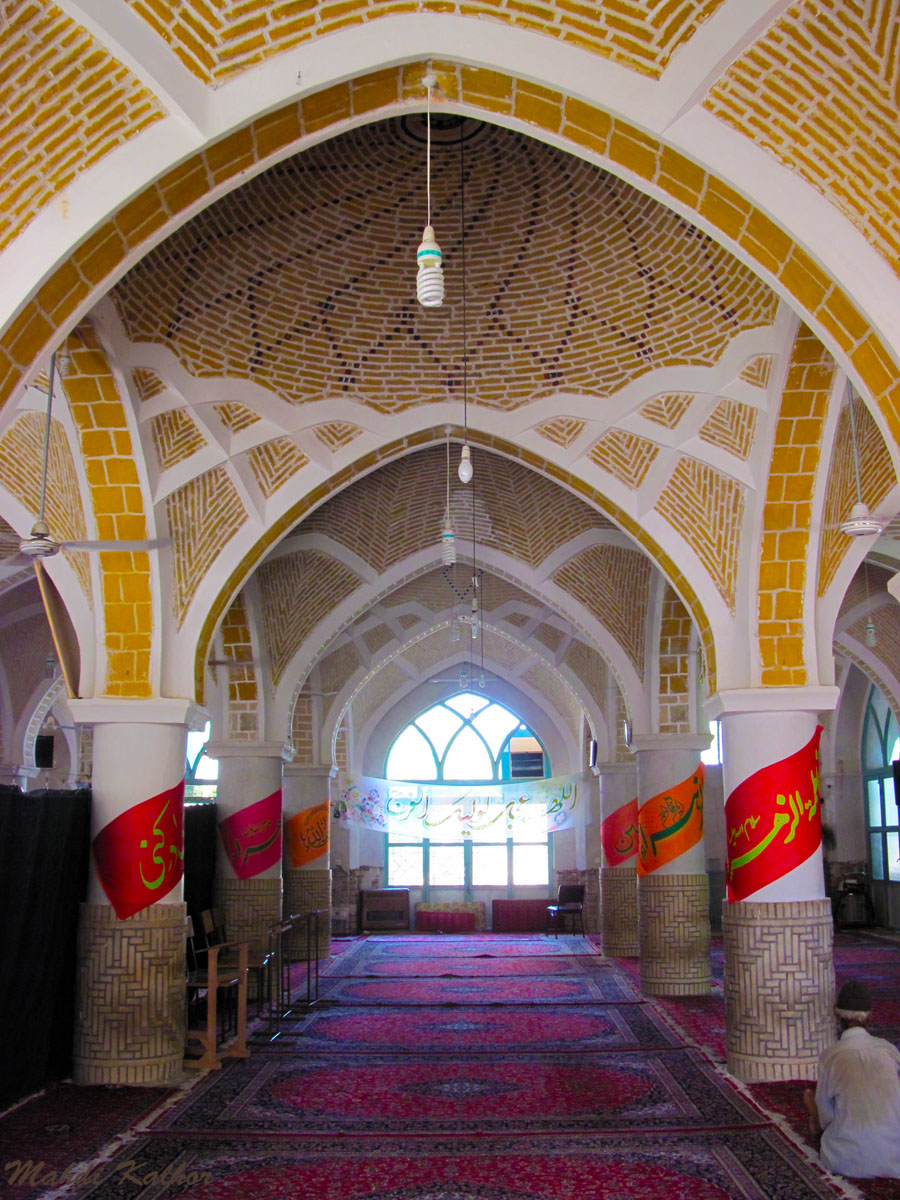

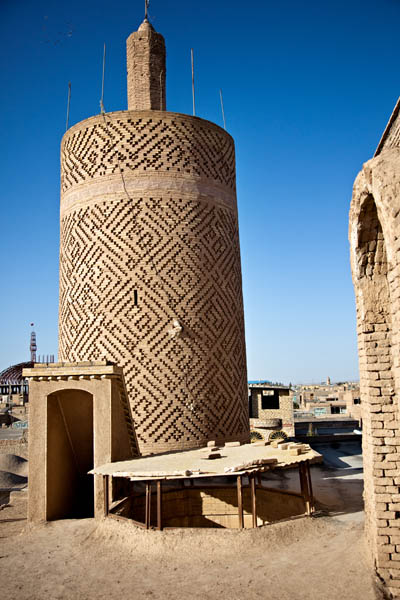
