= Jazink, Iran =

Rural district in Sistan and Baluchestan province, Iran

Jazink Rural District Persian: دهستان جزینک
- Rural District
- Location within Iran
- Coordinates: 30°53′06″N 61°33′27″E
- Country: Iran
- Province: Sistan and Baluchestan
- County: Zehak
- District: Jazink
- Capital: Jazink

Population (2016)
  - Total: 10,667
- Time zone: UTC+3:30 (IRST)

Jazink Rural District (Persian: دهستان جزینک) is in Jazink District of Zehak County, Sistan and Baluchestan province, Iran. It is administered from the city of Jazink.

== Demographics ==
=== Population ===
At the time of the 2006 National Census, the rural district's population was 10,702 in 2,230 households. There were 9,311 inhabitants in 2,246 households at the following census of 2011. The 2016 census measured the population of the rural district as 10,667 in 2,872 households. The most populous of its 50 villages was Qaleh Now, with 1,353 people.
