= Nako =

Nako may refer to:

== People ==
- Rudin Nako (born 1987), Albanian footballer

=== Given name ===
- Nako (Obotrite prince) (fl. 954–c. 966), Obotrite leader
- Nako Hirasawa (平澤 奈古) (born 1972), Japanese Paralympic archer
- Nako Misaki (岬 なこ), Japanese voice actress and singer
- Nako Mizusawa (水沢奈子) (born 1993), Japanese actress
- Nako Motohashi (本橋 菜子) (born 1993), Japanese women's basketball player
- Nako Spiru (1918–1947), Albanian politician
- Nako Yabuki (born 2001), Japanese singer and actress

=== Characters ===
- Nako Sonoda, a character in the manga Cat Street
- Nako Oshimizu, a character in the anime/manga Hanasaku Iroha
- Nadeshiko Yaeno, a character in the visual novel Nanatsuiro Drops
- Nako Kagura, a character in the manga Steel Angel Kurumi 2

== Places ==
- Nako Department, Burkina Faso
- Nakofunakata Station, a railway station in Tateyama, Chiba Prefecture, Japan
- Nako, Himachal Pradesh, a village in the Himalayas of northern India
- Nako Island, an island in Greenland
- Nako Lake, a high altitude lake in Pooh, Kinnaur, India
- Nako, another name for Pulau Hinako, an island in Indonesia

== See also ==
- Charalabos Nakos (born 1988), Greek footballer
