= Kavir Rural District (Aran and Bidgol County) =

Rural district in Isfahan province, Iran

Kavir Rural District Persian: دهستان كوير
- Rural District
- Location within Iran
- Coordinates: 34°07′N 52°02′E
- Country: Iran
- Province: Isfahan
- County: Aran and Bidgol
- District: Kavirat
- Established: 1996
- Capital: Hoseynabad

Population (2016)
  - Total: 4,317
- Time zone: UTC+3:30 (IRST)

Kavir Rural District (Persian: دهستان كوير) is in Kavirat District of Aran and Bidgol County, Isfahan province, Iran. Its capital is the village of Hoseynabad.

== Demographics ==
=== Population ===
At the time of the 2006 National Census, the rural district's population was 4,001 in 1,056 households. There were 4,655 inhabitants in 1,355 households at the following census of 2011. The 2016 census measured the population of the rural district as 4,317 in 1,395 households. The most populous of its 28 villages was Hoseynabad, with 1,743 people.

=== Other villages in the rural district ===
- Kaghazi
- Qasemabad
- Yazdelan
