= Sefiddasht Rural District =

Rural district in Isfahan province, Iran

Sefiddasht Rural District Persian: دهستان سفيددشت
- Rural District
- Location within Iran
- Coordinates: 34°15′N 51°43′E
- Country: Iran
- Province: Isfahan
- County: Aran and Bidgol
- District: Central
- Established: 1987
- Capital: Sefidshahr

Population (2016)
  - Total: 6,182
- Time zone: UTC+3:30 (IRST)

Sefiddasht Rural District (Persian: دهستان سفيددشت) is in the Central District of Aran and Bidgol County, Isfahan province, Iran. It is administered from the city of Sefidshahr. (Note: Formerly the village of Nasrabad)

== Demographics ==
=== Population ===
At the time of the 2006 National Census, the rural district's population was 5,872 in 1,545 households. There were 6,605 inhabitants in 1,884 households at the following census of 2011. The 2016 census measured the population of the rural district as 6,182 in 1,873 households. The most populous of its 62 villages was Yazdel, with 2,391 people.

=== Other villages in the rural district ===
- Aliabad-e Kavir
- Kadish
- Majdabad
- Mohammadabad
