= Chongyang =

Chongyang may refer to:

- Chongyang Festival (重阳节) or Double Ninth Festival, a Chinese traditional festival
- Chongyang County (崇阳县), of Xianning, Hubei, China
- Chongyang, Shaoguan (重阳镇), a town in Wujiang District, Shaoguan, Guangdong China
- Chongyang, Xixia County (重阳镇), a town in Xixia County, Henan, China
- Wang Chongyang (1113–1170), Chinese Taoist in the Song Dynasty

== See also ==
- Zhongyang (disambiguation)
