= Khvajeh Ahmad Rural District =

Rural district in Sistan and Baluchestan province, Iran

Khvajeh Ahmad Rural District Persian: دهستان خواجه احمد
- Rural District
- Location within Iran
- Coordinates: 30°51′44″N 61°45′28″E
- Country: Iran
- Province: Sistan and Baluchestan
- County: Zehak
- District: Central
- Capital: Khvajeh Ahmad

Population (2016)
  - Total: 9,342
- Time zone: UTC+3:30 (IRST)

Khvajeh Ahmad Rural District (Persian: دهستان خواجه احمد) is in the Central District of Zehak County, Sistan and Baluchestan province, Iran. Its capital is the village of Khvajeh Ahmad.

== Demographics ==
=== Population ===
At the time of the 2006 National Census, the rural district's population was 9,435 in 1,901 households. There were 10,042 inhabitants in 2,273 households at the following census of 2011. The 2016 census measured the population of the rural district as 9,342 in 2,537 households. The most populous of its 29 villages was Amir Nezam, with 2,385 people.
