= Naka =

Naka may refer to:

== Places in Japan ==
- Naka, Hyōgo, a former town in Hyōgo Prefecture
- Naka, Ibaraki, a city in Ibaraki Prefecture
- Naka, Tokushima, a town in Tokushima Prefecture
- Naka District, Ibaraki, a district in Ibaraki Prefecture
- Naka District, Kanagawa, a district in Kanagawa Prefecture
- Naka District, Shimane, a former district in Shimane Prefecture
- Naka District, Tokushima, a district in Tokushima Prefecture

== People with the surname ==
- Akiko Naka (仲 晶子; born 1980), Japanese ice hockey player
- Yuji Naka (born 1965), video game designer
- Tatsuya Naka, (born May 29, 1964), Japanese master of shotokan karate

== Others ==
- Na^{+}/K^{+}-ATPase, membrane bound enzyme used to maintain an electrochemical gradient
- "Naka", nickname of Japanese footballer Shunsuke Nakamura
- Japanese cruiser Naka
- Naka Benue Nigeria
- Naka-Kon, a Kansas City, Missouri-based anime convention

== See also ==
- Naka River (disambiguation), rivers in Japan
- Naka-ku (disambiguation), city wards of Japan
