= Kavirat Rural District =

Kavirat Rural District (Persian: دهستان كويرات) may refer to:

- Kavirat Rural District (Isfahan Province)
- Kavirat Rural District (Kerman Province)
