= Sefidshahr =

City in Isfahan province, Iran

Sefidshahr Persian: سفيدشهر
- City
- Location within Iran
- Coordinates: 34°07′35″N 51°21′04″E
- Country: Iran
- Province: Isfahan
- County: Aran and Bidgol
- District: Central
- Established as a city: 2003

Population (2016)
  - Total: 5,804
- Time zone: UTC+3:30 (IRST)

Sefidshahr (Persian: سفيدشهر) (Note: Formerly the village of Nasrabad (نصر آباد), also romanized as Naşrābād) is a city in the Central District of Aran and Bidgol County, Isfahan province, Iran, serving as the administrative center for Sefiddasht Rural District. The village of Nasrabad was converted to a city and renamed Sefidshahr in 2003.

== Demographics ==
=== Population ===
At the time of the 2006 National Census, the city's population was 5,151 in 1,249 households. The following census in 2011 counted 5,579 people in 1,616 households. The 2016 census measured the population of the city as 5,804 people in 1,700 households.

== Notabale people ==
Fatemeh Hamami, artist
