= Zehak =

City in Sistan and Baluchestan province, Iran

Zehak Persian: زهک
- City
- Location within Iran
- Coordinates: 30°53′36″N 61°40′44″E
- Country: Iran
- Province: Sistan and Baluchestan
- County: Zehak
- District: Central

Population (2016)
  - Total: 13,357
- Time zone: UTC+3:30 (IRST)

Zehak (Persian: زهک) is a city in the Central District of Zehak County, Sistan and Baluchestan province, Iran, serving as capital of both the county and the district. It is also the administrative center for Zehak Rural District.

== Climate ==
Zehak has a hot desert climate (BWh) according to the Köppen climate classification.

Climate data for Zehak(1992-2005 normals), elevation: 495.0 m (1,624.0 ft)
Month	Jan	Feb	Mar	Apr	May	Jun	Jul	Aug	Sep	Oct	Nov	Dec	Year
Daily mean °C (°F)	9.5 (49.1)	12.2 (54.0)	17.3 (63.1)	23.9 (75.0)	28.8 (83.8)	33.1 (91.6)	35.1 (95.2)	33.5 (92.3)	28.7 (83.7)	22.4 (72.3)	16.1 (61.0)	10.8 (51.4)	22.6 (72.7)
Average precipitation mm (inches)	14.9 (0.59)	10.3 (0.41)	13.2 (0.52)	6.1 (0.24)	0.6 (0.02)	0.0 (0.0)	0.0 (0.0)	0.0 (0.0)	0.0 (0.0)	0.2 (0.01)	1.4 (0.06)	6.3 (0.25)	53 (2.1)
Source: Iran Meteorological Organization (temperatures), (precipitation)

== Demographics ==
=== Population ===
At the time of the 2006 National Census, the city's population was 11,180 in 2,297 households. The following census in 2011 counted 14,324 people in 3,170 households. The 2016 census measured the population of the city as 13,357 people in 3,238 households.
