= Chūō =

Chūō (中央, Chūō, "central") may refer to:

== Places ==
- Chūō-ku (disambiguation), city wards named Chūō
  - Chūō, Tokyo, a special ward in Tokyo
- Chūō, Yamanashi, a city in Yamanashi Prefecture
- Chūō, Kumamoto, a former town in Kumamoto Prefecture
- Chūō, Okayama, a former town in Okayama Prefecture

== Transport ==
- Chūō Line (disambiguation), railway lines connecting Tokyo to Nagoya
- Chūō Shinkansen, a maglev line under construction between Tokyo and Osaka
- Chūō Expressway, a toll road connecting Tokyo and Nagoya

== Other ==
- Chuo University, Tokyo
- CHUO-FM, a Canadian community-based campus radio station
- (Korean: 중앙 (Hanja: 中央))
- Zhongyang (disambiguation) (Mandarin Chinese: 中央)
