= Zehak Rural District =

Rural district in Sistan and Baluchestan province, Iran

Zehak Rural District Persian: دهستان زهک
- Rural District
- Location within Iran
- Coordinates: 30°52′46″N 61°42′14″E
- Country: Iran
- Province: Sistan and Baluchestan
- County: Zehak
- District: Central
- Capital: Zehak

Population (2016)
  - Total: 30,493
- Time zone: UTC+3:30 (IRST)

Zehak Rural District (Persian: دهستان زهک) is in the Central District of Zehak County, Sistan and Baluchestan province, Iran. It is administered from the city of Zehak.

== Demographics ==
=== Population ===
At the time of the 2006 National Census, the rural district's population was 29,198 in 5,841 households. There were 30,611 inhabitants in 7,213 households at the following census of 2011. The 2016 census measured the population of the rural district as 30,493 in 8,211 households. The most populous of its 73 villages was Shahrak-e Kuhak, with 4,903 people.
