= Qaleh Now Rural District (Zehak County) =

Rural district in Sistan and Baluchestan province, Iran

Qaleh Now Rural District Persian: دهستان قلعه‌نو
- Rural District
- Location within Iran
- Coordinates: 30°44′35″N 61°36′09″E
- Country: Iran
- Province: Sistan and Baluchestan
- County: Zehak
- District: Jazink
- Capital: Qaleh Now
- Time zone: UTC+3:30 (IRST)

Qaleh Now Rural District (Persian: دهستان قلعه‌نو) is in Jazink District of Zehak County, Sistan and Baluchestan province, Iran. Its capital is the village of Qaleh Now, whose population at the time of the 2016 National Census was 1,353 people in 358 households.

== History ==
Qaleh Now Rural District was created in Jazink District after the 2016 census.
