= Charalampos Nakos =

Greek footballer

Personal information
- Full name: Charalampos Nakos
- Date of birth: 19 November 1988
- Place of birth: Agrinio, Greece
- Height: 1.79 m (5 ft 10 in)
- Position: Midfielder

Youth career
- Panetolikos

Senior career*
| Years | Team | Apps | (Gls) |
| 2007–2010 | Panetolikos | 2 | (0) |
| 2009–2010 | → Elaiofyto (loan) | | |
| 2010–2011 | Tilikratis F.C. | | |
| 2011–2012 | AE Messolongi | | |
| 2012 | Tilikratis F.C. | | |
- * Club domestic league appearances and goals

Charalampos Nakos (born 19 November 1988) is a Greek football midfielder currently a free agent.

He started his career from the Panetolikos youth squad. During the 2009–2010 season, he played for Elaiofyto, on loan from Panetolikos.

In July 2010, he was released on a free transfer. He played for Tilikratis F.C. in the 2010–2011 season. Subsequently, he spent 6 months playing for AE Messolongi. In January 2012 he returned to Tilikratis F.C. who were competing in Football League 2.
