= Maranjab Desert =

Desert in Iran

Coordinates: 34°18′1.011″N 51°49′56.7654″E

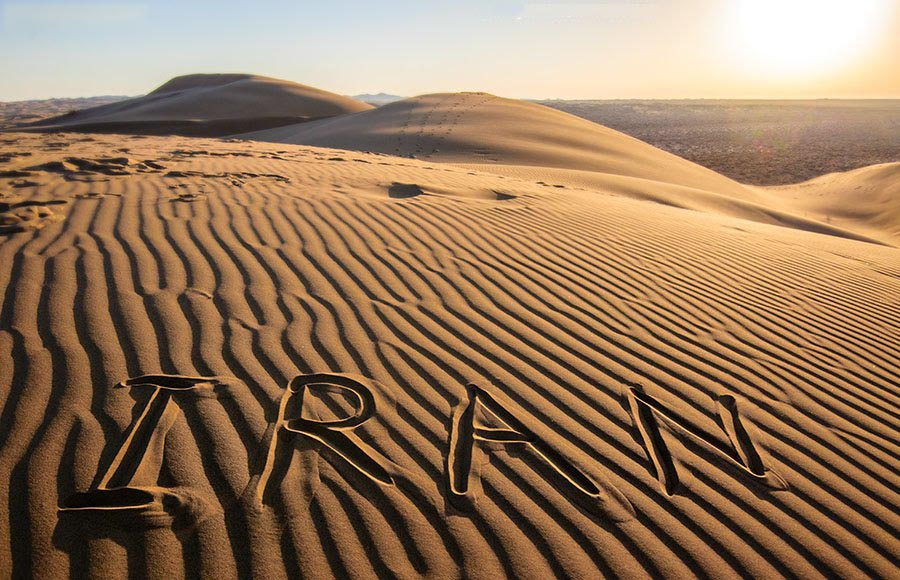
Maranjab Desert

The Maranjab Desert (Persian: کویر مرنجاب) is a desert region located in the northern part of Aran and Bidgol County, in Isfahan province, central Iran. It is part of the Dasht-e Kavir basin and is characterized by sand dunes, salt pans, and seasonal wetlands. The area contains historical structures such as the Maranjab Caravansarai, constructed in 1603. Despite its arid conditions, the desert supports salt-tolerant vegetation and various species of wildlife, including reptiles and birds. The region is also a site of recreational activities, though concerns have been raised about the environmental impact of tourism.

== History ==
A notable historical structure within the desert is the Maranjab Caravansarai, constructed during the reign of Abbas the Great in 1603. Situated on the former Silk Road, the caravanserai functioned as a stopover for traders and travelers crossing the desert. It is square in shape, covers an area of 3,500 square metres (38,000 sq ft), and contains 29 rooms.

A freshwater well is located approximately 5 km east of the caravanserai. Despite the arid environment, the water is potable due to natural sand filtration, which removes salt content. The region also contains numerous qanat, traditional subterranean aqueducts designed to transport water from mountainous areas to arid zones. Over 1,680 kilometres (1,040 mi) of qanat tunnels have been documented in Aran and Bidgol County. These systems are increasingly being replaced by deep wells and modern irrigation techniques, contributing to overdrafting and soil salinization.

== Geography ==
The Maranjab Desert is bordered to the north by the Mesileh Salt Lake, to the east by the Hoze Sultan and Hoze Marreh ponds, to the west by the expansive central Iranian deserts, and to the south, it adjoins the urban area of Aran and Bidgol. The elevation of the region, particularly in the Band-e Rig dunes, ranges from approximately 800 to 1,000 metres above sea level. According to the Santidrj Martin classification, the desert's climate is hyperarid and cold, with an annual mean temperature of 3.19°C and an average yearly precipitation of 8.1 mm.

The terrain comprises sand dunes, salt pans, and seasonal wetlands. Sand dunes in the area can reach heights of up to 70 metres, while the salt flats exhibit polygonal crystallization patterns during dry seasons. During periods of rainfall, the salt lake fills partially, creating reflective surfaces and revealing temporary features such as the so-called "Wandering Island" (Jazire Sargardan).

=== Flora and fauna ===
Vegetation in the Maranjab Desert is adapted to saline and arid conditions. Plant communities vary by elevation and include species such as Artemisia sieberi, Zygophyllum eurypterum, Calligonum spp., Haloxylon salicornicum, Soda rosmarinus, Haloxylon persicum, Alhagi spp., Atraphaxis spp., Ferula ammoniacum, Ferula assa-foetida, Teucrium polium, and Astragalus spp. In higher elevations, the landscape supports Amygdalus, Pistacia, and Juniperus species. The area also includes stands of tagh forests.

The desert supports populations of desert-dwelling birds and reptiles, including various eagle species, snakes, and lizards. A 2012–2013 herpetological survey in the neighbouring Yazd province, which shares ecological characteristics with Maranjab Desert, identified 16 lizard species across six families, including Phrynocephalus maculatus, Trapelus agilis, Agamura persica, Eremias fasciata, Mesalina watsonana, Teratoscincus bedriagai, and Varanus griseus. Though not all species were recorded directly in Maranjab Desert, their presence in ecologically similar regions suggests a shared lizard fauna across the Iranian plateau.

Species under threat in the desert include Eremias kavirensis (endemic to Dasht-e Kavir), the desert monitor (Varanus griseus), Cheesman's gerbil, scorpions, and the Maranjab's snake skink. Recreational activities, especially off-road driving, pose a risk to native flora and fauna by destroying vegetation, disturbing nesting and burrowing habitats, and fragmenting the ecosystem.
