= Zhongyang =

Zhongyang usually refers to something related to the central government of China. It especially can refer to:

- National Central University, known as Guólì Zhōngyāng Dàxué, founded in Nanjing and now located in Zhongli
- Central Committee of the Chinese Communist Party (中国共产党中央委员会), abbreviated zhongyang (中央)
- Central Daily News (中央日報), once the official newspaper of the Kuomintang
- Academia Sinica, or Zhongyang Yanjiuyuan (中央硏究院), the National Academy of the ROC (Taiwan)

== See also ==
- Zhongyang County (中阳), in Shanxi province
- Chongyang (disambiguation)
- Chūō (disambiguation) (Japanese: 中央)
