= Khamak, Hirmand =

Khamak خمك
- Village
- Location within Iran
- Coordinates: 31°15′03″N 61°39′15″E
- Country: Iran
- Province: Sistan and Baluchestan
- County: Hirmand
- Bakhsh: Qorqori
- Rural District: Qorqori

Population (2006)
  - Total: 234
- Time zone: UTC+3:30 (IRST)
  - Summer (DST): UTC+4:30 (IRDT)

Khamak (Persian: خمك, also Romanized as Khāmak) is a village in Qorqori Rural District, Qorqori District, Hirmand County, Sistan and Baluchestan Province, Iran. At the 2006 census, its population was 234, in 45 families.
