= Seigo Nakao =

Japanese academic

Seigo Nakao is the head of Japanese Studies at Oakland University in Rochester, Michigan, United States. He is the author of many books relating to Japan including The Random House Japanese-English English-Japanese dictionary and the Japanese Reference Dictionary published by Berlitz, the Langenscheidt's Japanese dictionary : Japanese-English, English-Japanese, and several smaller dictionaries. He is a translator of such classical Japanese works as Daidōji Yūzan's Code of the Samurai, and is a published literary critic with pieces available dealing with Akira Yoshimura, and others.

He was born in Nagasaki, received his Ph.D. from New York University, and first taught in America in New York City before coming to Oakland University where he now resides. He is also a fan of Yukio Mishima's work.

== List of literary works ==
- Berlitz Japanese-English English-Japanese Dictionary

Langenscheidt Pub Inc, ISBN 2-8315-7124-3 (2-8315-7124-3)

- Daidoji Yuzan's Code of the Samurai:

A Contemporary Dual-Language Edition of the Bushido Shoshinshu Seigo Nakao(translator)

- Dirty Japanese: Everyday Slang from "What's Up?" to "F*%# Off!

by Seigo Nakao, Lindsay Mack (Illustrator) Ulysses Pr, ISBN 1-56975-565-5 (1-56975-565-5)

- Langenscheidt's Pocket Japanese Dictionary: Japanese-English English-Japanese

by Seigo Nakao Langenscheidt Pub Inc, ISBN 0-88729-171-6 (0-88729-171-6)

- Random House Japanese-English English-Japanese Dictionary

by Seigo Nakao Ballantine Books, ISBN 0-345-40548-X (0-345-40548-X)

- Random House Webster's Pocket Japanese Dictionary: Japanese, English, English, Japanese

by Seigo Nakao Random House Inc, ISBN 0-679-77373-8 (0-679-77373-8)

- Random House Webster's Pocket Japanese Dictionary: Japanese-English English-Japanese

by Seigo Nakao Random House Inc, ISBN 0-375-72195-9 (0-375-72195-9)

- Random House Japanese-English English-Japanese Dictionary

by Seigo Nakao Random House Information Group, ISBN 0-679-44149-2 (0-679-44149-2)

=== Essays ===
- Akira Yoshimura. One Man's Justice.: An article from: World Literature Today

by Seigo Nakao

- Snakelust.(Review): An article from: World Literature Today

by Seigo Nakao
