= Naka-ku =

Naka-ku (中区, lit. 'central ward') is a common ward name in many Japanese cities. It may refer to:

- Naka-ku, Hamamatsu, Shizuoka Prefecture
- Naka-ku, Hiroshima, Hiroshima Prefecture
- Naka-ku, Nagoya, Aichi Prefecture
- Naka-ku, Okayama, Okayama Prefecture
- Naka-ku, Sakai, Osaka Prefecture
- Naka-ku, Yokohama, Kanagawa Prefecture

== See also ==
- Chūō-ku
- Jung District, similar place name in Korean cities
