= Central district, Plovdiv =

District of Plovdiv, Bulgaria

Coordinates: 42°8′40″N 24°44′49″E

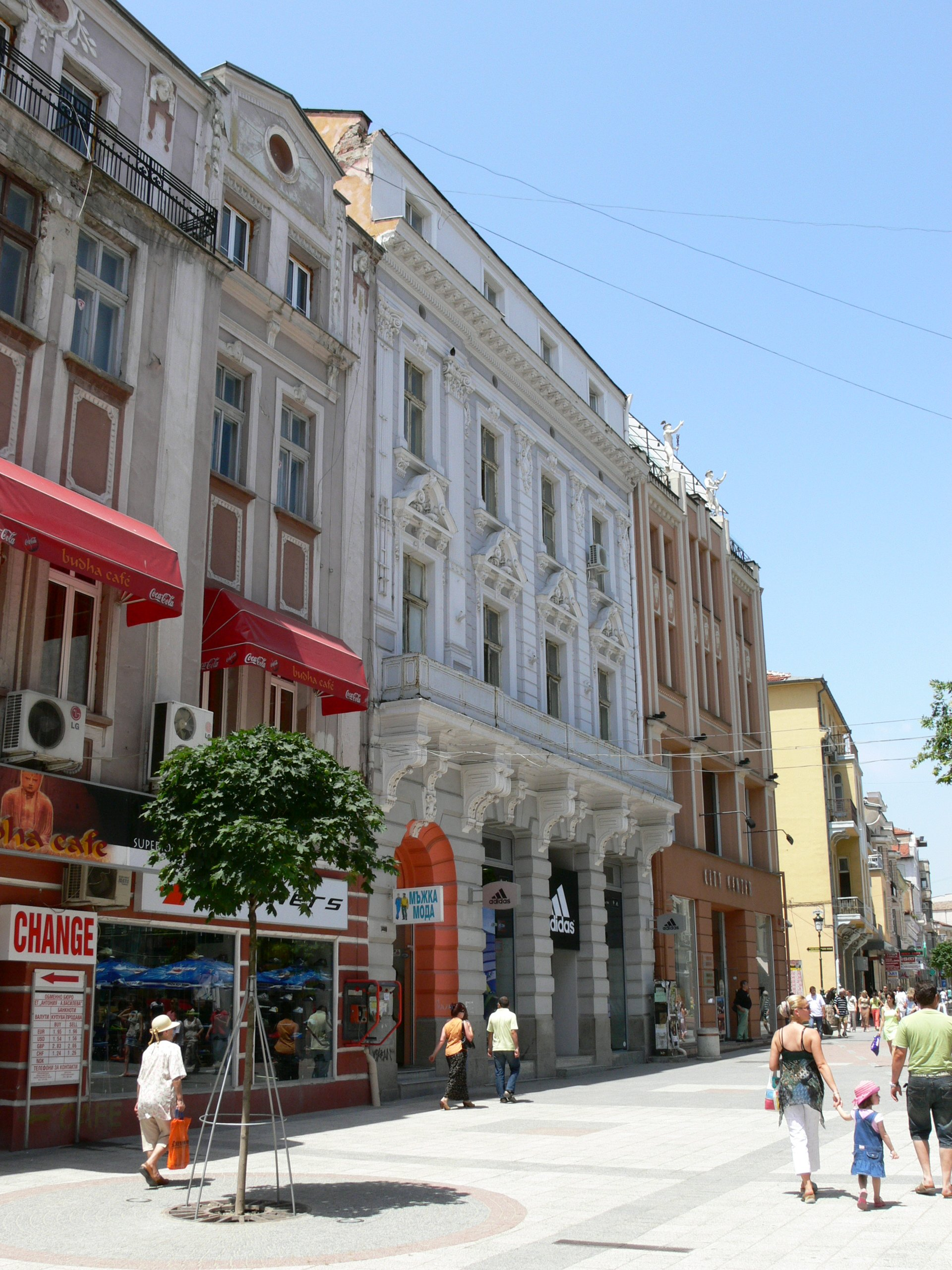
The main street.

Central district (Bulgarian: Район Централен) is one of the six districts of Plovdiv in southern Bulgaria. It has 84,431 inhabitants. Most of Plovdiv's major sights are situated in the district - Roman stadium, Roman Odeon, Ancient theatre, the Watchtower on Sahat tepe (one the city's seven hills), the central street and many others. There is a large numbers of shopping centers, bars and administrative buildings. There are a lot of green spaces.

== Sites for rest and walking ==
The city garden and the Singing Fountains are located in the 'Central' district. It is a pleasant place to go for a walk. Several of the avenues in the garden lead to the central square from where the main pedestrian street begins and goes to the pedestrian bridge above the Maritsa river near Novotel Plovdiv. There are many shops, cafés, bars and restaurants along the main street.

== Shopping ==
There are many large trade centers and malls including Grand Trade Center, Market Center, Teipan, Scandinavia, Central Hali, Rilon, Pedestrian Bridge and others. Markovo Tepe mall is already open.
