= Kavirat Rural District (Aran and Bidgol County) =

Rural district in Isfahan province, Iran

Kavirat Rural District Persian: دهستان کویرات
- Rural District
- Location within Iran
- Coordinates: 33°55′N 51°40′E
- Country: Iran
- Province: Isfahan
- County: Aran and Bidgol
- District: Kavirat
- Established: 1987
- Capital: Abuzeydabad

Population (2016)
  - Total: 3,996
- Time zone: UTC+3:30 (IRST)

Kavirat Rural District (Persian: دهستان کویرات) is in Kavirat District of Aran and Bidgol County, Isfahan province, Iran. It is administered from the city of Abuzeydabad.

== Demographics ==
=== Population ===
At the time of the 2006 National Census, the rural district's population was 3,650 in 958 households. There were 3,817 inhabitants in 1,128 households at the following census of 2011. The 2016 census measured the population of the rural district as 3,996 in 1,276 households. The most populous of its 20 villages was Mohammadabad, with 2,104 people.

=== Other villages in the rural district ===
- Aliabad
- Dasht-e Anqolab
- Fakhreh
