= Khamak District =

District in Sistan and Baluchestan province, Iran

Khamak District Persian: بخش خمک
- District
- Location within Iran
- Coordinates: 30°56′03″N 61°35′51″E
- Country: Iran
- Province: Sistan and Baluchestan
- County: Zehak
- Capital: Khamak
- Time zone: UTC+3:30 (IRST)

Khamak District (Persian: بخش خمک) is in Zehak County, Sistan and Baluchestan province, Iran. Its capital is the village of Khamak, whose population at the time of the 2016 National Census was 1,542 people in 464 households.

== History ==
After the 2016 census, Khamak Rural District was separated from Jazink District in the formation of Khamak District.

== Demographics ==
=== Administrative divisions ===
Khamak District
Administrative Divisions
Guri RD
Khamak RD
RD = Rural District
