= Naka River (Ibaraki–Tochigi) =

River in Kantō, Japan

Naka River Nakagawa
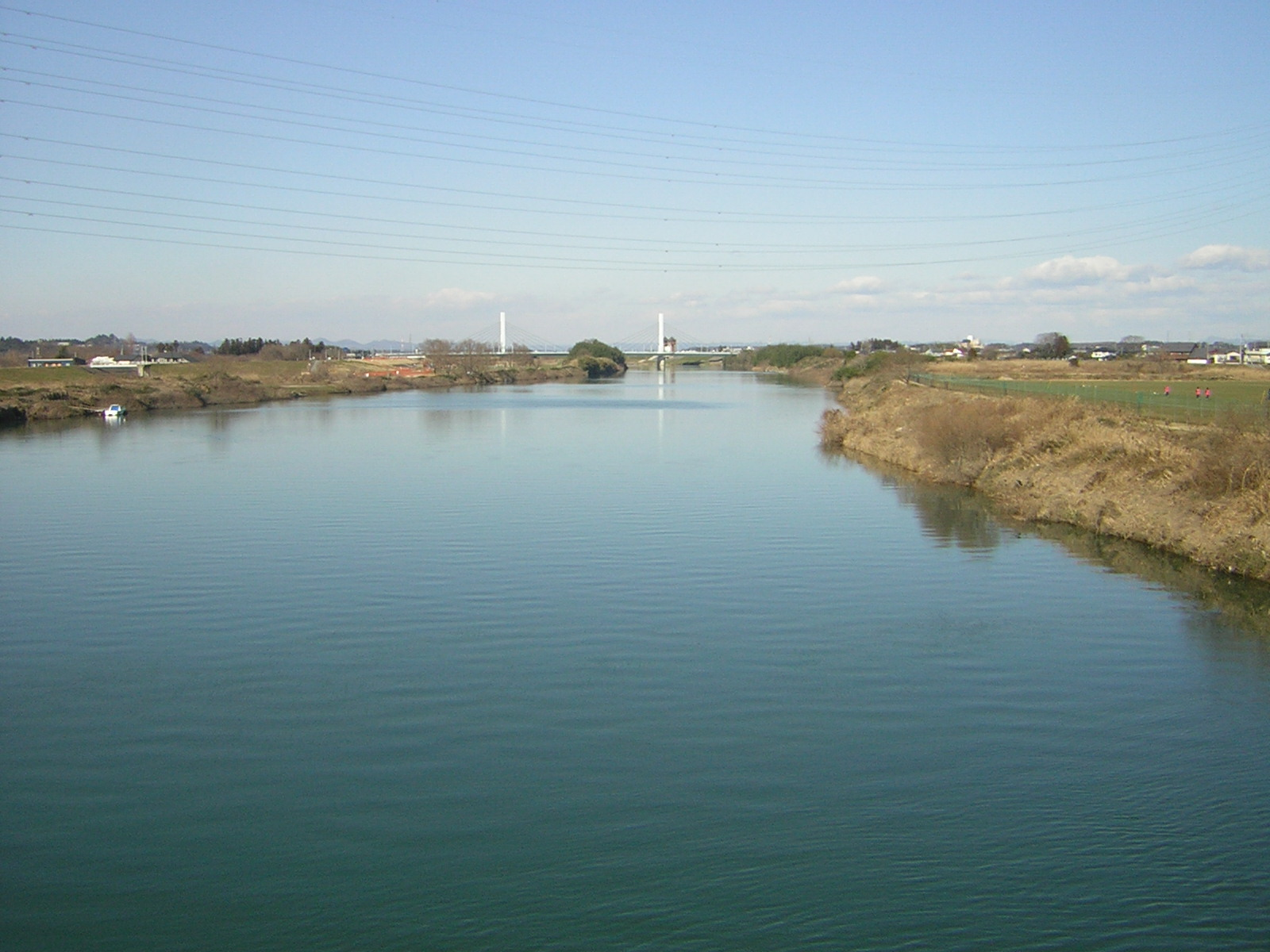
- Naka River at Mito, Ibaraki (January 2007)
- /2/idsDoes not match the regex pattern ^Q[1-9]\d{0,19}(\s*,\s*Q[1-9]\d{0,19})*$; /2/idsString value found, but an array is required; /2/idsFailed to match exactly one schema; /2/titleThe property title is required; /2/serviceDoes not have a value in the enumeration ["page"]; /2Failed to match exactly one schema; /2/geometriesThe property geometries is required; /2/typeDoes not have a value in the enumeration ["GeometryCollection"]; /2/typeDoes not have a value in the enumeration ["MultiPolygon"]; /2/typeDoes not have a value in the enumeration ["Point"]; /2/typeDoes not have a value in the enumeration ["MultiPoint"]; /2/typeDoes not have a value in the enumeration ["LineString"]; /2/typeDoes not have a value in the enumeration ["MultiLineString"]; /2/typeDoes not have a value in the enumeration ["Polygon"]; /2/coordinatesThe property coordinates is required; /2/geometryThe property geometry is required; /2/typeDoes not have a value in the enumeration ["Feature"]; /2/featuresThe property features is required; /2/typeDoes not have a value in the enumeration ["FeatureCollection"]
- Location within Japan
- Native name: 那珂川 (Japanese)

Location
- Country: Japan

Physical characteristics
- Source
  - location: Mount Nasu, border of Fukushima and Tochigi Prefectures
- Mouth
  - location: Pacific Ocean at Ibaraki Prefecture
  - coordinates: 36°20′09″N 140°35′42″E
  - elevation: 0 m (0 ft)
- Length: 150 km (93 mi)
- Basin size: 3,270 km^{2} (1,260 sq mi)
- Discharge
  - average: 96.1 m^{3}/s (3,390 cu ft/s)

The Naka River (那珂川, Naka-gawa) is a river in eastern Honshu, Japan. It flows through the prefectures of Tochigi and Ibaraki and empties to the Pacific Ocean. More than 50 species of fish live in the river, including dace, chum salmon, ayu, and herring. The Japanese government categorizes it as a Class 1 river. The river has a length of 150 kilometres (93 mi), and drains an area of 3,270 square kilometres (1,260 mi^{2}), including parts of neighboring Fukushima Prefecture. Its source is at Nasu-dake in Nikkō National Park.

== Naming ==
- Japanese cruiser Naka
