= Naka River (Tone River tributary) =

River in Japan

Coordinates: 35°39′37″N 139°51′00″E

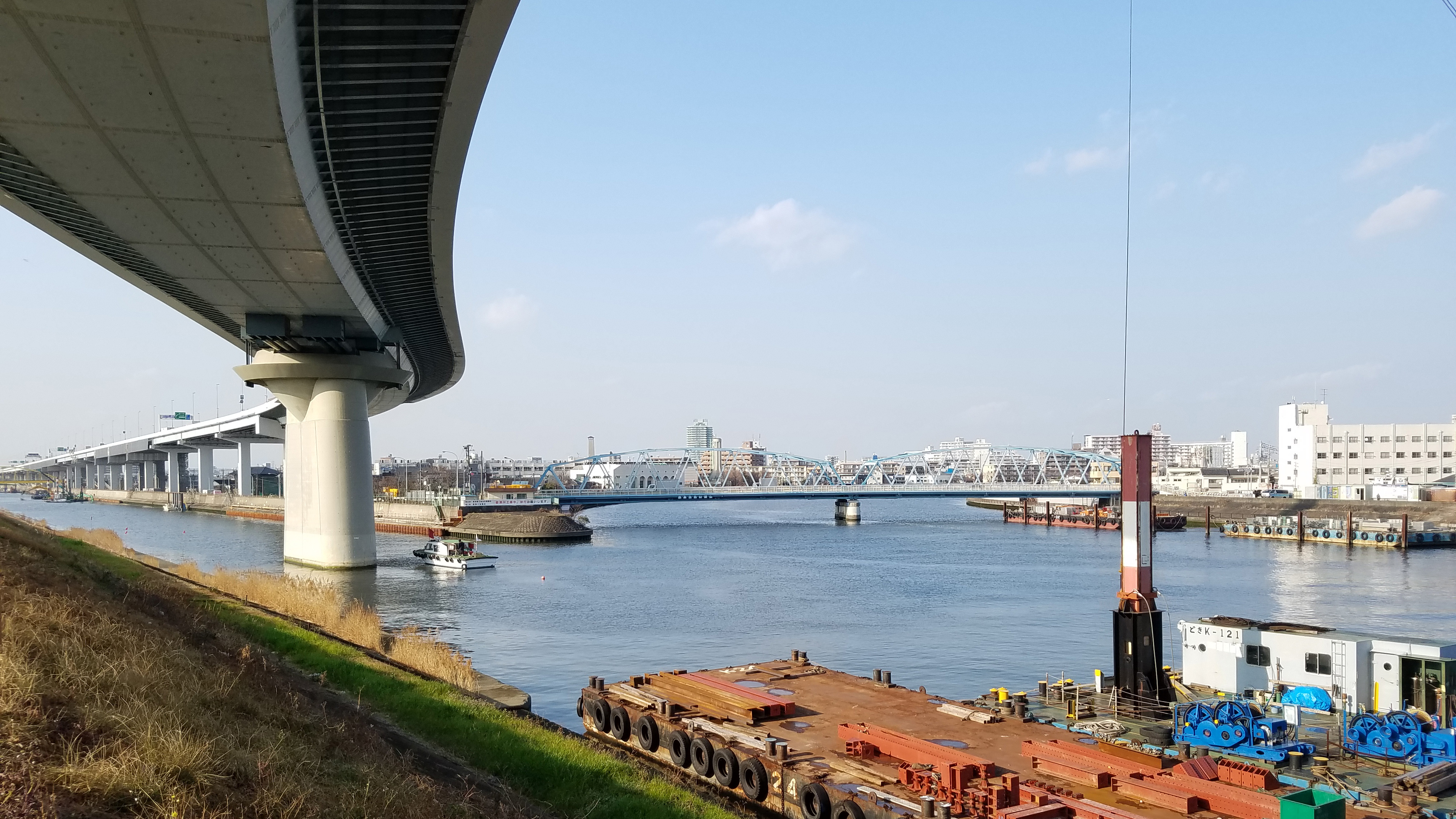

- Location within Japan

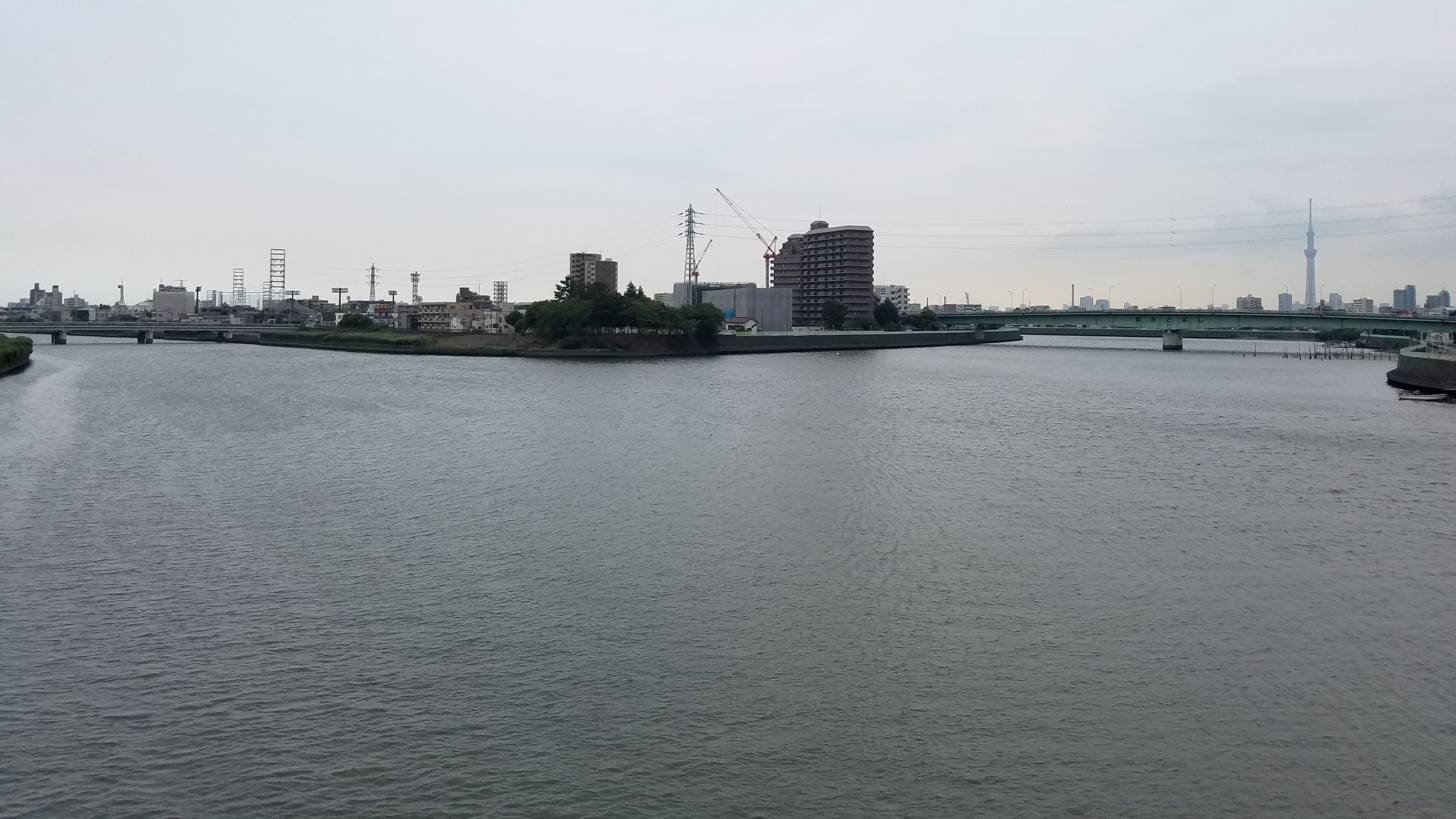

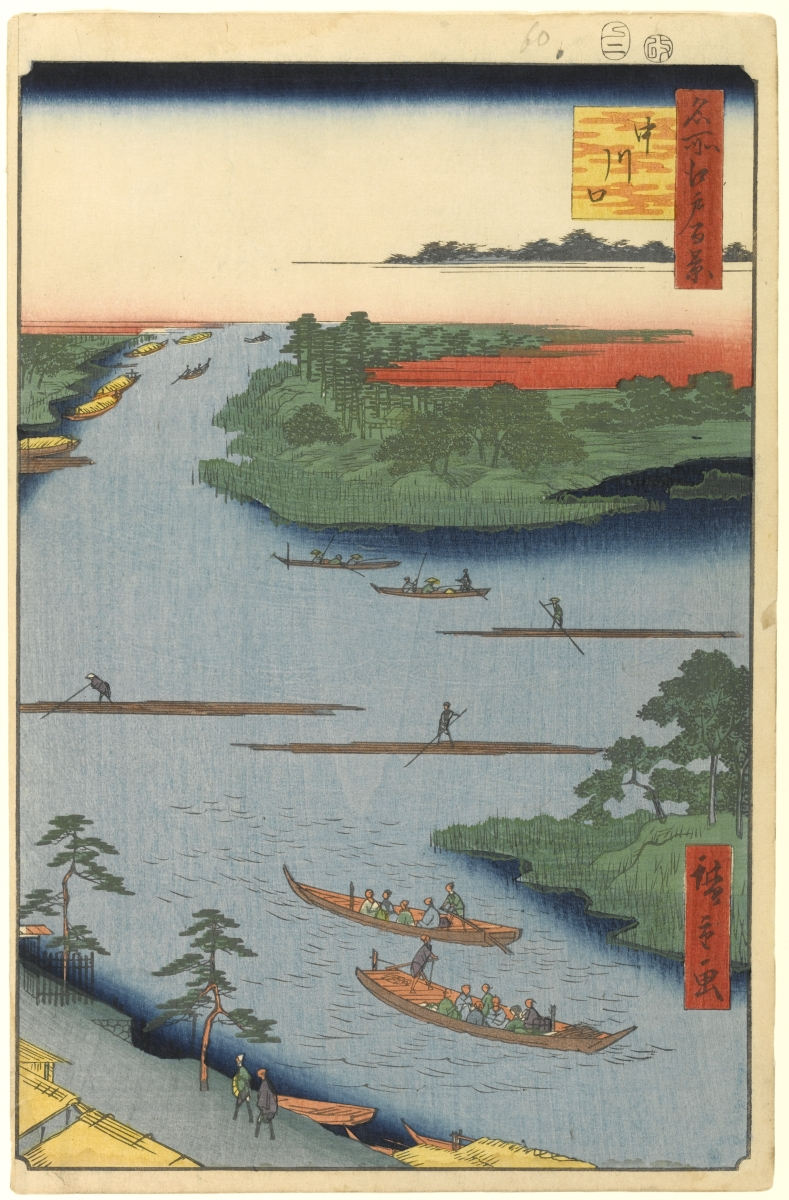
Nakagawa in the Edo period

The Naka River (中川, Naka-gawa) is a river that flows from Hanyu, Saitama to Edogawa, Tokyo, Japan, where it merges with the Arakawa River. It is 83.7 kilometres (52.0 mi) long.
