= Jung District =

Jung District (Korean: 중구; Hanja: 中區; RR: Jung-gu; MR: Chung-gu), meaning "Central District", is the name of a gu (district) in several South Korean cities:

- Jung District, Busan
- Jung District, Daegu
- Jung District, Daejeon
- Jung District, Incheon
- Jung District, Seoul
- Jung District, Ulsan

== See also ==
- Chung-guyok, Pyongyang, North Korea
- Central District (disambiguation)
