= Abuzeydabad =

City in Isfahan province, Iran

Abuzeydabad Persian: ابوزيدآباد
- City
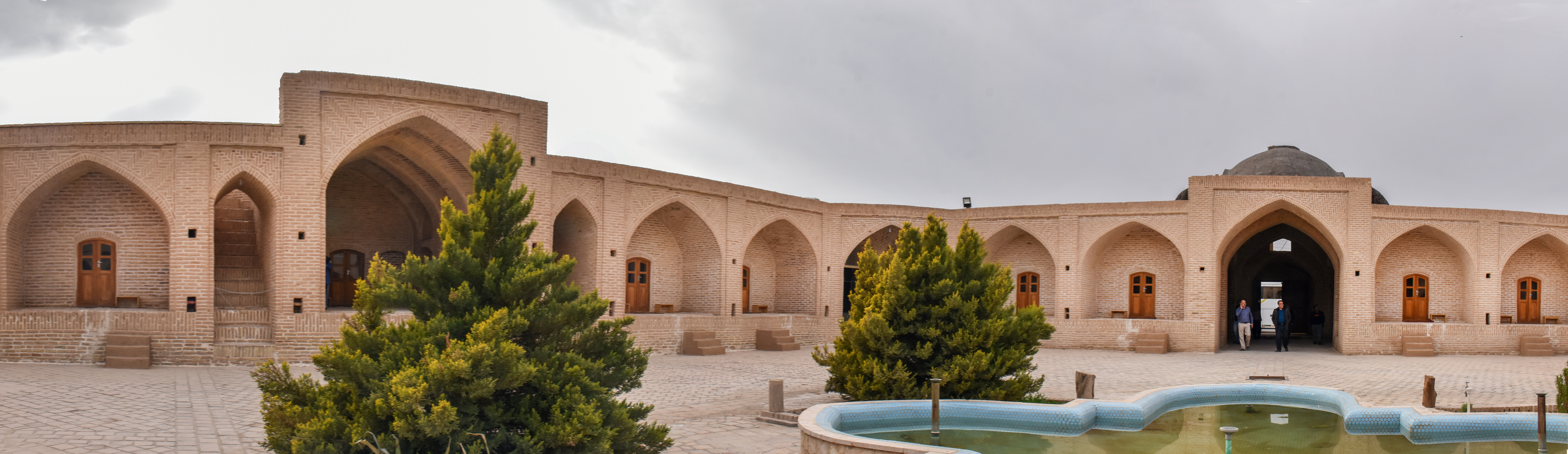
- Shah Abbasi Caravanserai of Abuzeydabad

- Location within Iran
- Coordinates: 33°54′02″N 51°45′58″E
- Country: Iran
- Province: Isfahan
- County: Aran and Bidgol
- District: Kavirat
- Established as a city: 1996

Population (2016)
  - Total: 5,976
- Time zone: UTC+3:30 (IRST)

Abuzeydabad (Persian: ابوزيدآباد) (Note: Also romanized as Abu Zaidābād, Abū Zeydābād, and Abūzeydābād) is a city in, and the capital of, Kavirat District in Aran and Bidgol County, Isfahan province, Iran. It also serves as the administrative center for Kavirat Rural District. The village of Abuzeydabad was converted to a city in 1996.

== Demographics ==
=== Language ===
People in Abuzeydabad speak the Abuzeydabadi dialect.

=== Population ===
At the time of the 2006 National Census, the city's population was 5,160 in 1,318 households. The following census in 2011 counted 5,559 people in 1,584 households. The 2016 census measured the population of the city as 5,976 people in 1,784 households.
