= Chūō-ku =

Chūō-ku (中央区; Japanese pronunciation: [c̟͡ɕɨ̀ɨ́.ó̞ò̞(.kɯ̈̀), -ó̞ó̞, c̟͡ɕɨ́ɨ́-]; lit. 'Central Ward') may refer to wards of Japan:

- Chūō-ku, Sapporo
- Chūō-ku, Saitama
- Chūō-ku, Chiba
- Chūō, Tokyo
- Chūō-ku, Sagamihara
- Chūō-ku, Niigata
- Chūō-ku, Hamamatsu
- Chūō-ku, Osaka
- Chūō-ku, Kobe
- Chūō-ku, Fukuoka
- Chūō-ku, Kumamoto

== See also ==
- Naka-ku
