= Aran and Bidgol =

City in Isfahan province, Iran

Aran and Bidgol Persian: آران و بیدگل
- City
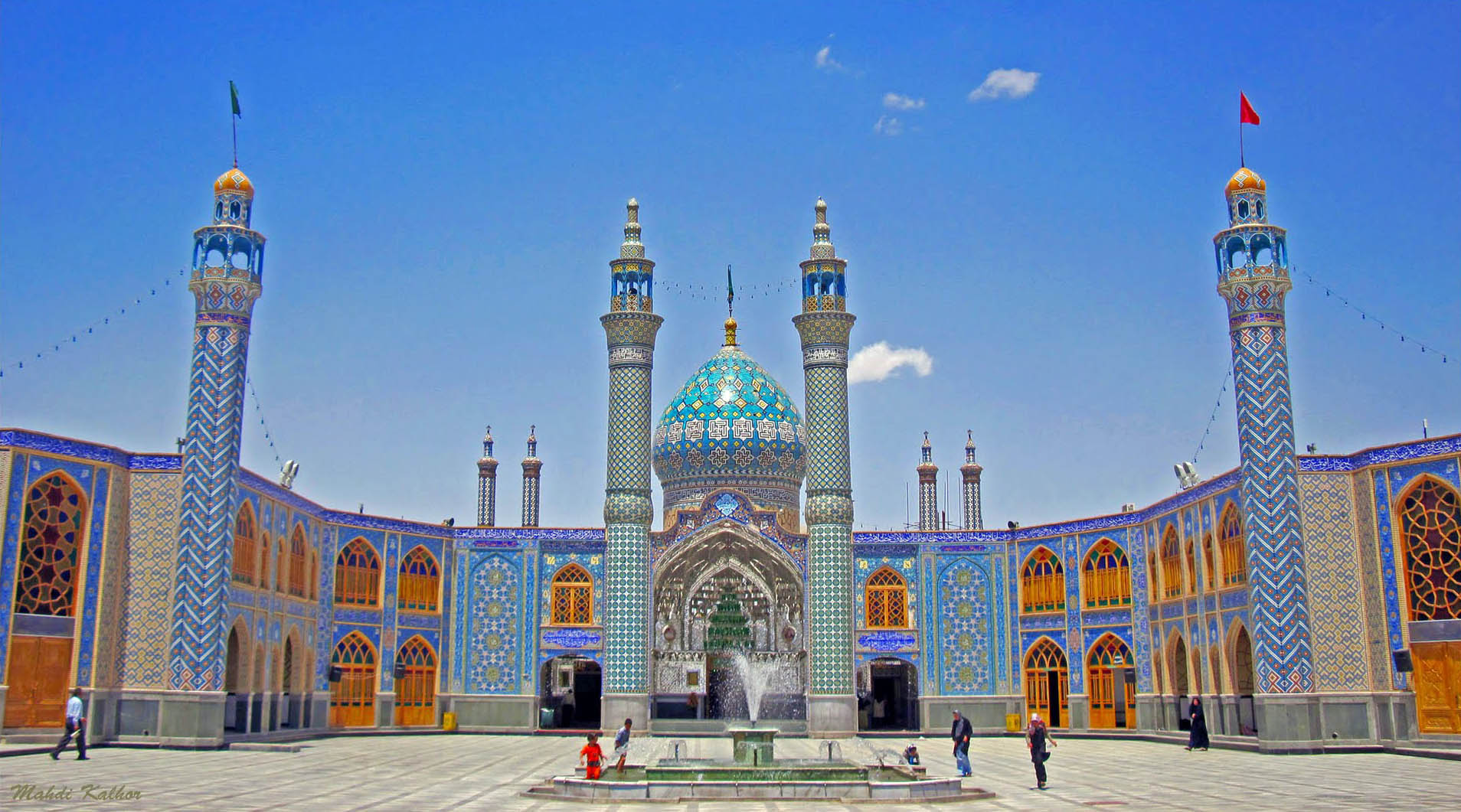
- Holy shrine of Imamzadeh Hilal ibn Ali in Aran and Bidgol

- Location within Iran
- Coordinates: 34°03′32″N 51°28′54″E
- Country: Iran
- Province: Isfahan
- County: Aran and Bidgol
- District: Central

Population (2016)
  - Total: 65,404
- Time zone: UTC+3:30 (IRST)

Aran and Bidgol (Persian: آران و بیدگل) (Note: Also romanized as Aran o Bidgol, Ārān va Bīdgol and Ārān-o-Bīd Gol (English: Aran and Bidgol) The city's name is an amalgam of two formerly separate settlements: Aran (آران), also romanized as Ārān, and also known as Arūn; and Bidgol (بیدگل)) is a city in the Central District of Aran and Bidgol County, Isfahan province, Iran, serving as capital of both the county and the district. It is one of the ancient desert cities of the province, close to Namak lake.

== History ==
The area originally consisted of two distinct and separate cities named "Aran" and "Bidgol." Each city had its own customs, social communications, and dialect. It was situated near the Silk Road and many caravans passed it on their way from Europe to the Orient.

About 40 years ago, the wall of separation collapsed and these two small towns unified.

== Demographics ==
=== Population ===
At the time of the 2006 National Census, the city's population was 55,651 in 15,556 households. The following census in 2011 counted 60,290 people in 24,842 households. The 2016 census measured the population of the city as 65,404 people in 20,315 households.

== Geography ==
The town is surrounded by desert from the north and east, and thus it has a typical climate of hot and dry in summer, cold and dry in winter, and very little rainfall during the year. These conditions make agriculture difficult.

== Industry ==
Carpet weaving is one of the major industrial products of this city and its carpets are exported to Afghanistan, Pakistan, Iraq and other neighboring countries. Recently, sources of natural gas and oil have been discovered near the city.

Unfortunately, due to the unauthorized and illegal use of underground water tables by companies such as Foulad and Zob, this city has suffered a severe water shortage crisis, and as a result, we are witnessing severe land subsidence.

== Tourist attractions ==
- Deserts and salt lakes tours
- Camel riding in desert
- Driving on sand dunes
- Maranjab Caravansarai
- Si zan castle
- Holy shrines and religious mausoleums (belonging to the offspring of the prophet Muhammad).

== Gallery ==
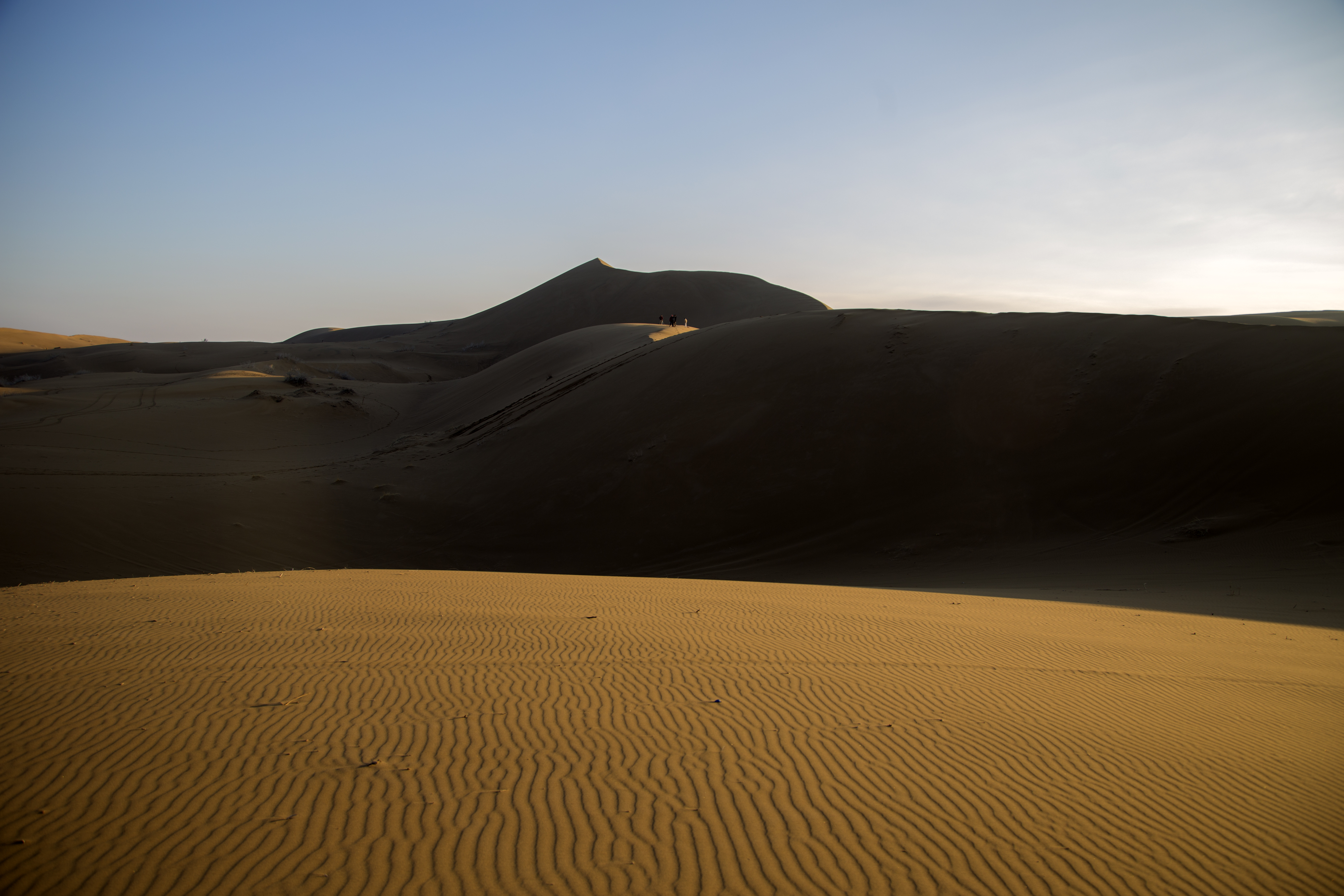
Aran and Bidgol desert

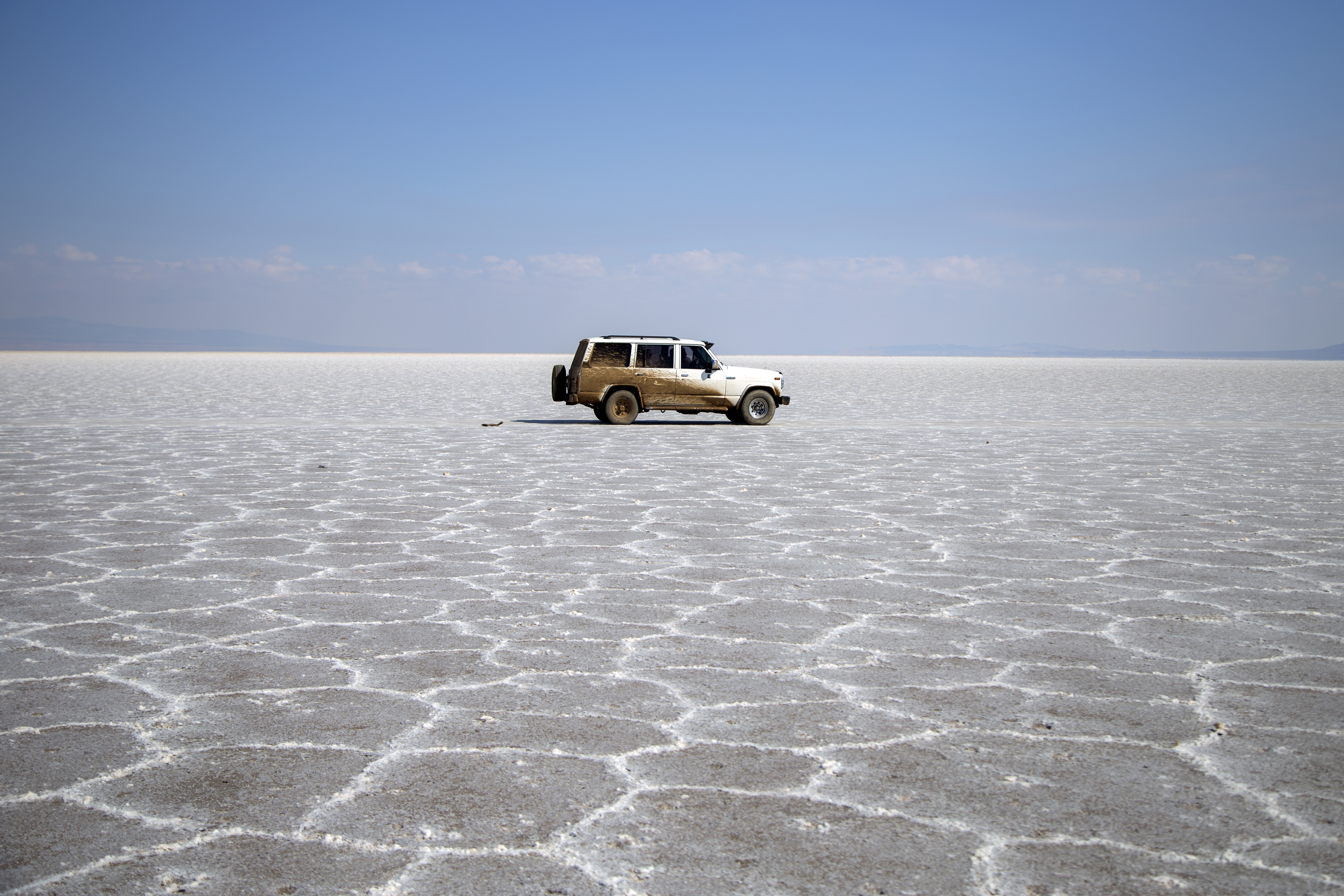
Aran and Bidgol salt Lake

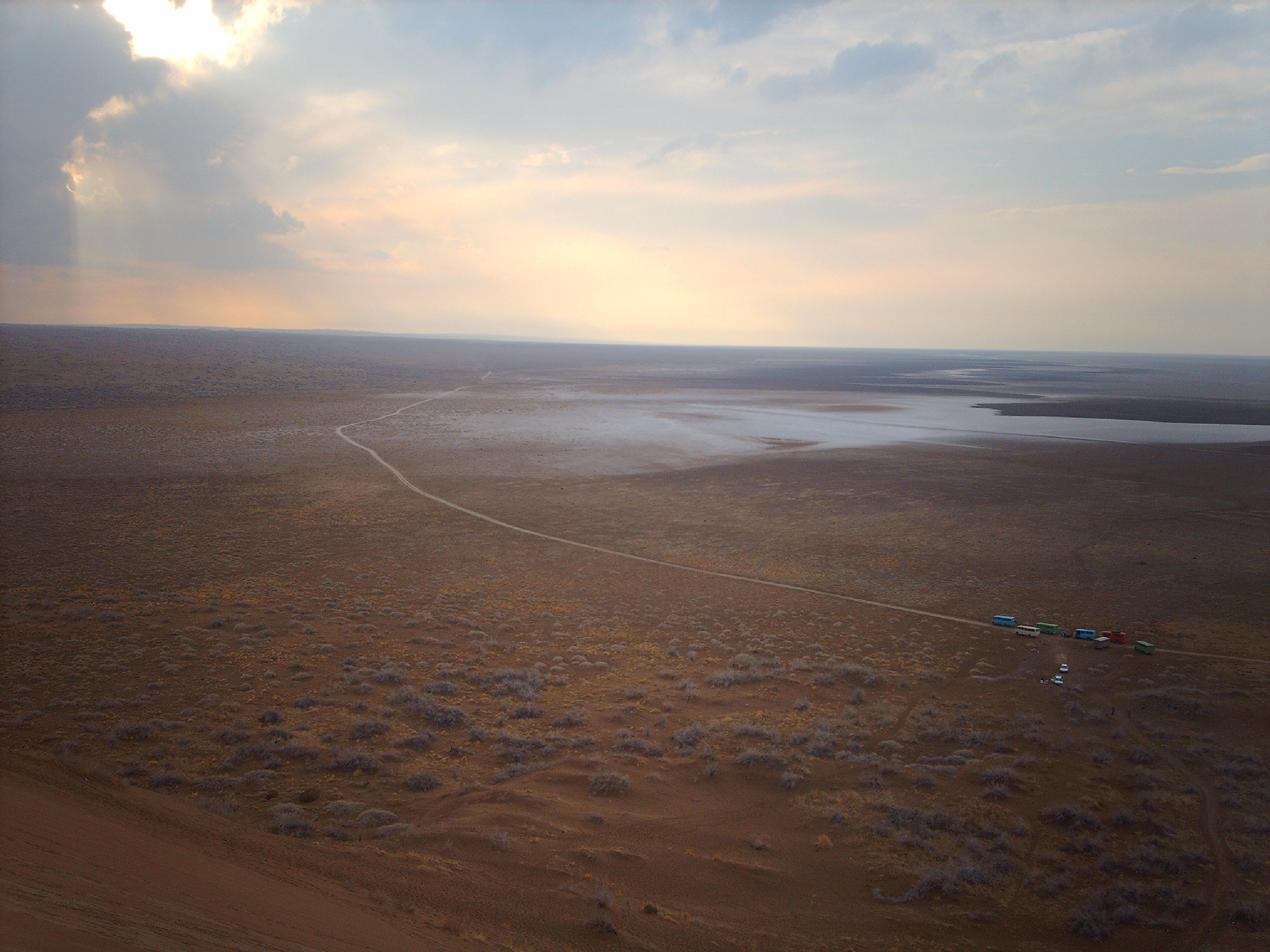
Aran and Bidgol desert scenery is a tourist attraction

== See also ==
- Kashan
- Isfahan province
- Iranian history

Aran va Bidgol travel guide from Wikivoyage

Media related to Aran va Bidgol at Wikimedia Commons
