= Khamak Rural District =

Rural district in Sistan and Baluchestan province, Iran

Khamak Rural District Persian: دهستان خمک
- Rural District
- Location within Iran
- Coordinates: 30°53′52″N 61°36′40″E
- Country: Iran
- Province: Sistan and Baluchestan
- County: Zehak
- District: Khamak
- Capital: Khamak

Population (2016)
  - Total: 11,037
- Time zone: UTC+3:30 (IRST)

Khamak Rural District (Persian: دهستان خمک) is in Khamak District of Zehak County, Sistan and Baluchestan province, Iran. Its capital is the village of Khamak.

== Demographics ==
=== Population ===
At the time of the 2006 National Census, the rural district's population (as a part of Jazink District) was 10,324 in 2,414 households. There were 11,126 inhabitants in 2,977 households at the following census of 2011. The 2016 census measured the population of the rural district as 11,037 in 3,197 households. The most populous of its 65 villages was Khamak, with 1,542 people.

After the census, the rural district was separated from the district in the formation of Khamak District.
