= Jazink District =

District in Sistan and Baluchestan province, Iran

Jazink District Persian: بخش جزینک
- District
- Location within Iran
- Coordinates: 30°47′08″N 61°36′19″E
- Country: Iran
- Province: Sistan and Baluchestan
- County: Zehak
- Capital: Jazink

Population (2016)
  - Total: 21,704
- Time zone: UTC+3:30 (IRST)

Jazink District (Persian: بخش جزینک) is in Zehak County, Sistan and Baluchestan province, Iran. Its capital is the city of Jazink.

== History ==
After the 2016 National Census, Qaleh Now Rural District was created in the district, and Khamak Rural District was separated from it in the establishment of Khamak District. The village of Jazink was elevated to the status of a city in 2019.

== Demographics ==
=== Population ===
At the time of the 2006 census, the district's population was 21,026 in 4,644 households. The following census in 2011 counted 20,437 people in 5,223 households. The 2016 census measured the population of the district as 21,704 inhabitants in 6,069 households.

=== Administrative divisions ===
Jazink District Population
Administrative Divisions	2006	2011	2016
Jazink RD	10,702	9,311	10,667
Khamak RD (Note: Transferred to Khamak District after the 2016 census)	10,324	11,126	11,037
Qaleh Now RD (Note: Established after the 2016 census)			
Jazink (city) (Note: Became a city after the 2016 census)			
Total	21,026	20,437	21,704
RD = Rural District
