= Central District (Zehak County) =

District in Sistan and Baluchestan province, Iran

Central District (Zehak County) Persian: بخش مرکزی شهرستان زهک
- District
- Location within Iran
- Coordinates: 30°52′46″N 61°42′14″E
- Country: Iran
- Province: Sistan and Baluchestan
- County: Zehak
- Capital: Zehak

Population (2016)
  - Total: 53,192
- Time zone: UTC+3:30 (IRST)

The Central District of Zehak County (Persian: بخش مرکزی شهرستان زهک) is in Sistan and Baluchestan province, Iran. Its capital is the city of Zehak.

== Demographics ==
=== Population ===
At the time of the 2006 National Census, the district's population was 49,813 in 10,039 households. The following census in 2011 counted 54,977 people in 12,656 households. The 2016 census measured the population of the district as 53,192 inhabitants in 13,986 households.

=== Administrative divisions ===
Central District (Zehak County) Population
Administrative Divisions	2006	2011	2016
Khvajeh Ahmad RD	9,435	10,042	9,342
Zehak RD	29,198	30,611	30,493
Zehak (city)	11,180	14,324	13,357
Total	49,813	54,977	53,192
RD = Rural District
