= Zehak County =

County in Sistan and Baluchestan province, Iran

Zehak County Persian: شهرستان زهک
- County
- Location of Zehak County in Sistan and Baluchestan province (top right, yellow)

- Location of Sistan and Baluchestan province in Iran
- Coordinates: 30°48′34″N 61°38′56″E
- Country: Iran
- Province: Sistan and Baluchestan
- Capital: Zehak
- Districts: Central, Jazink, Khamak

Population (2016)
  - Total: 74,896
- Time zone: UTC+3:30 (IRST)

Zehak County (Persian: شهرستان زهک) is in Sistan and Baluchestan province, Iran. Its capital is the city of Zehak.

== History ==
After the 2016 National Census, Qaleh Now Rural District was created in Jazink District, and Khamak Rural District was separated from it in the formation of Khamak District, including the new Guri Rural District. The village of Jazink was elevated to the status of a city in 2019.

== Demographics ==
=== Population ===
At the time of the 2006 census, the county's population was 70,839 in 14,683 households. The following census in 2011 counted 75,419 people in 17,849 households. The 2016 census measured the population of the county as 74,896 in 20,055 households.

=== Administrative divisions ===
Zehak County's population history and administrative structure over three consecutive censuses are shown in the following table.

Zehak County Population
Administrative Divisions	2006	2011	2016
Central District	49,813	54,977	53,192
Khvajeh Ahmad RD	9,435	10,042	9,342
Zehak RD	29,198	30,611	30,493
Zehak (city)	11,180	14,324	13,357
Jazink District	21,026	20,437	21,704
Jazink RD	10,702	9,311	10,667
Khamak RD	10,324	11,126	11,037
Qaleh Now RD (Note: Established after the 2016 census)			
Jazink (city) (Note: Became a city after the 2016 census)			
Khamak District			
Guri RD			
Khamak RD			
Total	70,839	75,419	74,896
RD = Rural District

== See also ==
Media related to Zehak County at Wikimedia Commons
