= Central District (Aran and Bidgol County) =

District in Isfahan province, Iran

Central District (Aran and Bidgol County) Persian: بخش مرکزی شهرستان آران و بیدگل
- District
- Location within Iran
- Coordinates: 34°15′N 51°43′E
- Country: Iran
- Province: Isfahan
- County: Aran and Bidgol
- Established: 1996
- Capital: Aran and Bidgol

Population (2016)
  - Total: 89,228
- Time zone: UTC+3:30 (IRST)

The Central District of Aran and Bidgol County (Persian: بخش مرکزی شهرستان آران و بیدگل) is in Isfahan province, Iran. Its capital is the city of Aran and Bidgol.

== Demographics ==
=== Population ===
At the time of the 2006 National Census, the district's population was 77,150 in 21,209 households. The following census in 2011 counted 83,378 people in 24,842 households. The 2016 census measured the population of the district as 89,228 inhabitants in 27,595 households.

=== Administrative divisions ===
Central District (Aran and Bidgol County) Population
Administrative Divisions	2006	2011	2016
Sefiddasht RD	5,872	6,605	6,182
Aran and Bidgol (city)	55,651	60,290	65,404
Nushabad (city)	10,476	10,904	11,838
Sefidshahr (city)	5,151	5,579	5,804
Total	77,150	83,378	89,228
RD = Rural District
