= Kavirat District =

District in Isfahan province, Iran

Kavirat District Persian: بخش کویرات
- District
- Location within Iran
- Coordinates: 34°07′N 51°57′E
- Country: Iran
- Province: Isfahan
- County: Aran and Bidgol
- Established: 1996
- Capital: Abuzeydabad

Population (2016)
  - Total: 14,289
- Time zone: UTC+3:30 (IRST)

Kavirat District (Persian: بخش کویرات) is in Aran and Bidgol County, Isfahan province, Iran. Its capital is the city of Abuzeydabad.

== Demographics ==
=== Population ===
At the time of the 2006 National Census, the district's population was 12,811 in 3,332 households. The following census in 2011 counted 14,031 people in 4,067 households. The 2016 census measured the population of the district as 14,289 inhabitants in 4,455 households.

=== Administrative divisions ===
Kavirat District Population
Administrative Divisions	2006	2011	2016
Kavir RD	4,001	4,655	4,317
Kavirat RD	3,650	3,817	3,996
Abuzeydabad (city)	5,160	5,559	5,976
Total	12,811	14,031	14,289
RD = Rural District
