= Aran and Bidgol County =

County in Isfahan province, Iran

Aran and Bidgol County Persian: شهرستان آران و بیدگل
- County
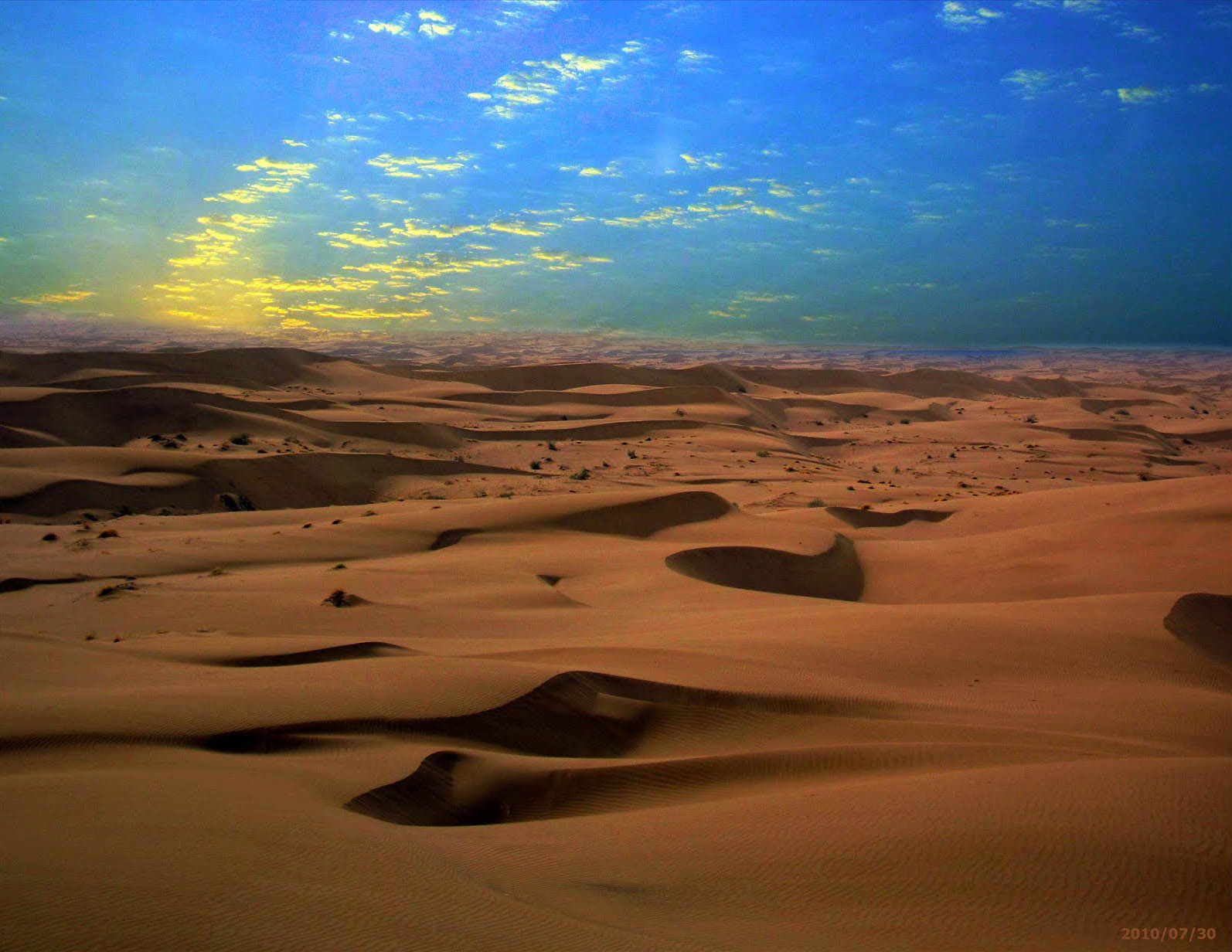
- Maranjab Desert in Kavir National Park

- Location of Aran and Bidgol County in Isfahan province (top, pink)

- Location of Isfahan province in Iran
- Coordinates: 34°10′N 51°49′E
- Country: Iran
- Province: Isfahan
- Capital: Aran and Bidgol
- Districts: Central, Kavirat

Population (2016)
  - Total: 103,517
- Time zone: UTC+3:30 (IRST)

Aran and Bidgol County (Persian: شهرستان آران و بیدگل) is in Isfahan province, Iran. Its capital is the city of Aran and Bidgol.

== Demographics ==
=== Population ===
At the time of the 2006 National Census, the county's population was 89,961 in 24,541 households. The following census in 2011 counted 97,409 people in 28,902 households. The 2016 census measured the population of the county as 103,517 in 32,050 households.

=== Administrative divisions ===
Aran and Bidgol County's population history and administrative structure over three consecutive censuses are shown in the following table.

Aran and Bidgol County Population
Administrative Divisions	2006	2011	2016
Central District	77,150	83,378	89,228
Sefiddasht RD	5,872	6,605	6,182
Aran o Bidgol (city)	55,651	60,290	65,404
Nushabad (city)	10,476	10,904	11,838
Sefidshahr (city)	5,151	5,579	5,804
Kavirat District	12,811	14,031	14,289
Kavir RD	4,001	4,655	4,317
Kavirat RD	3,650	3,817	3,996
Abuzeydabad (city)	5,160	5,559	5,976
Total	89,961	97,409	103,517
RD = Rural District

== Economy ==
The city is the second largest manufacturer of machine-made carpets in the world.

Carpets, rugs and other types of carpets can be mentioned among the important souvenirs of this city. Also, Abbas-Ali bread ( "naan-e Abbas-Ali", a type of sweet bread ), Aran and Bidgol local sohan ( "sovvouni", a very delicious substitute for sugar loaf ), and lake salt, Aran and Bidgol salt are some of the edible souvenirs of this County.

== Tourism ==
The county is one of the important tourist spots of Iran due to the presence of the holy threshold of Imamzadeh Mohammad Helal ibn-e Ali (AS), the Aran o Bidgol salt lakes, and Maranjab Desert.

Maranjab Desert is located in Aran and Bidgol. County. Among the attractive activities of the desert are camel riding; observing the desert sky at night and "meteor rain;" and "sand climbing" in the dunes.

== See also ==
Media related to Aran va Bidgol County at Wikimedia Commons
