= List of Jewish diaspora languages =

This is a list of languages and groups of languages that developed within Jewish diaspora communities through contact with surrounding languages.

== Afro-Asiatic languages ==
=== Cushitic languages ===
- Kayla
- Qwara

=== Semitic languages ===
==== Arabic languages ====
- Judeo-Arabic

- Judeo-Algerian Arabic
- Judeo-Andalusi Arabic †
- Judeo-Egyptian Arabic
- Judeo-Iraqi Arabic
  - Jewish Baghdadi Arabic
- Judeo-Levantine Arabic †
  - Judeo-Syrian Arabic
  - Modern Judeo-Palestinian Arabic
- Judeo-Moroccan Arabic
- Judeo-Tripolitanian Arabic
- Judeo-Tunisian Arabic
- Judeo-Yemeni Arabic

- Karaite Egyptian Arabic, based on old Egyptian Arabic

==== Aramaic languages ====
- Judeo-Aramaic

- Hulaulá (Persian Kurdistani Jewish Neo-Aramaic)
- Jewish Babylonian Aramaic †
- Jewish Palestinian Aramaic †

- Galilean dialect †

- Lishana Deni (Zakho Jewish Neo-Aramaic)
- Lishan Didan (Persian Azerbaijani Jewish Neo-Aramaic)
- Lishanid Noshan (Arbil Jewish Neo-Aramaic)

=== Other Afro-Asiatic languages ===
- Judeo-Berber (a group of different Jewish Berber languages and their dialects)

== Austronesian languages ==
- Judeo-Malay †

== Dravidian languages ==
- Judeo-Malayalam

(both written in local alphabets)

== Indo-European languages ==
=== Germanic languages ===
- Jewish English Languages
- Lachoudisch †
- Lotegorisch †
- Yiddish
  - Eastern Yiddish
  - Western Yiddish
  - Scots-Yiddish

=== Indo-Aryan languages ===
- Judeo-Gujarati
- Judeo-Hindustani
- Judeo-Marathi
- Judeo-Urdu †

=== Iranian languages ===
- Judeo-Bukharic (Bukhari, Bukhori, Judeo-Tajik) (with some city koinés, e.g., Judeo-Tajik koiné of Samarkand)
- Judeo-Golpaygani †
- Judeo-Hamedani (possibly extinct)
- Judeo-Kashani
- Judeo-Persian (Dzhidi, Jidi)
- Judeo-Shirazi
- Judeo-Tat (Juhuri)

=== Romance languages ===
- Judeo-Latin †
- Judeo-Aragonese † (have some impact on Judeo-Spanish citylect of Skopje)

- Judeo-Navarro-Aragonese † (with a significant Jewish koiné of Tudela)

- Judeo-Asturleonese † (have some lexical traces in Judeo-Spanish)
- Judeo-French (Zarphatic) † (a group of Jewish northern oïl languages and their dialects)
- Judeo-Portuguese (almost extinct, still preserved in small communities of Portugal, Northern Africa and the Netherlands)

- Judeo-Galician †

- Judaeo-Catalan † (existence doubted)
- Judeo-Sicilian (including the zone of so-called Meridionali Estremi (Far Southern) dialects of Sicily, Calabria and Apulia, including Judeo-Salentino of Corfu) (extinct or almost extinct)
- Judeo-Occitan

- Judeo-Gascon †
- Judeo-Provençal †

- Judeo-Niçard †

- Judeo-Spanish (Judezmo, Ladino)

- Haketia
- Tetuani

- Judeo-Italian

- Judeo-Ferrarese † (Giudeo-Ferrarese) in Ferrara
- Judeo-Modenese † (Giudeo-Modenese) in Modena
- Judeo-Pitigliano/Judeo-Pitgilianese † (Giudeo-Pitigliano/Giudeo-Pitgiliananese) in Tuscany
- Judeo-Salentinian † (Giudeo-Salentino) In Salentino
- Judeo-Resan † (Giudeo-Resab) in the region of Reggio Emilia of Emilia-Romagna
- Judeo-Torinese † (Giudeo-Torinese) in Turin
- Judeo-Italian of Lugo Di Romanga † (Giudeo-italiano di Lugo Di Romanga) in Lugo Di Romanga
- Judeo-Italian of Moncalvo † (Giudeo-italiano di Moncalvo) in Moncalvo
- Judeo-Italian of Casale Monferrato † (Giudeo-italiano di Casale Monferrato) in Casale Monferrato
- Judeo-Italian of Finale Emilia † (Giudeo-italiano di Finale Emilia) in Finale Emilia
- Judeo-Roman (Giudeo-Romanesco) in Rome
- Judeo-Livornese (Bagitto) † (Bagitto/Giudeo-Livornese) in Livorno
- Judeo-Florentine † (Giudeo-Fiorentino) in Florence
- Judeo-Venetian † (Giudeo-Veneziano) in Venice
- Judeo-Triestine † (Giudeo-Triestino) in Trieste
- Judeo-Veronese † (Giudeo-Veronese) in Verona
- Judeo-Reggiano † (Giudeo-Reggiano) in Reggio Emilia
- Judeo-Piedmontese † (Giudeo-Piemontese) in the region of Piedmont
- Judeo-Mantuan † (Giudeo-Mantovano) in Mantua

=== Other Indo-European languages ===
- Judeo-Czech (Knaanic) †
- Judeo-Greek (Romaniyot, Yevanic)

- Judeo-Sicilian Greek †

- Judeo-Koiné Greek †

== Kartvelian languages ==
- Judeo-Georgian
- Judeo-Mingrelian†

== Turkic languages ==
- Judeo-Azerbaijani (dialect of previously Aramaic-speaking Jews of Miyandoab)
- Judeo-Crimean Tatar (Krymchak) (almost extinct)
- Judeo-Turkish (Influenced the Krymchak and some of Karaim languages, or even was the origin of some of them)
- Karaim (almost extinct, most likely a group of separate Turkic languages with Kypchak and Oghuz traces With Hebrew words)

== Creole languages ==
- Judaeo-Papiamento
- Judeo-Manado Malay †

== See also ==
- Jewish languages
