= Central Plateau languages (Iranian) =

Northwestern Iranian dialect group spoken in central Iran

- Central Plateau dialects (CPD)
- Geographic distribution: Central Iranian Plateau
- Linguistic classification: Indo-European: Iranian; Western; Northwestern; Central Plateau languages
- Subdivisions: Northwest Central Plateau; Northeast Central Plateau (Rāji group); Southeast Central Plateau; Southwest Central Plateau

Language codes
- Glottolog: nucl1790

The Central Plateau languages, also called the Central Plateau Dialects (CPD), are a group of Northwestern Iranian languages spoken in cities, towns and villages of central Iran, particularly in the provinces of Isfahan Province, Markazi Province, Yazd Province and Qom Province.

== History ==
The majority of the population of Isfahan once spoke these languages. The Central Iranian dialects appear to have had a common origin. The old dialects of Kerman and Yazd, preserved by the Zoroastrians and Jews of those cities; the former dialect of Isfahan, traces of which survive in the poetry of figures such as Owḥadi of Isfahan; and the speech of the Jewish communities along the Zayandeh River and in Gaz are all considered part of this group. This language group, sometimes referred to as the Rāji/Caspi language, was also spoken in the cities of Ray, Qom, and Hamadan. According to Shams-i Qays Razi, the people of Ray and Iraq-i Ajam preferred their own local Fahlavi poetry to Persian verse. In Borujerd and Khorramabad, these dialects were spoken among Jewish communities, and some religious minority groups there have preserved elements of the old speech. The medieval scholar Ibn al-Muqaffa' reported that these dialects were known in earlier periods as Fahlavī, and in even older times as Pahlavī.

The Central Iranian dialects spoken in and around Kashan are considered to represent a continuation of Median with respect to their linguistic structure. Many Central Iranian dialects have retained the grammatical gender system, based on the masculine–feminine distinction inherited from Old Iranian, (Note: Old Iranian possessed three grammatical genders, masculine, feminine and neuter.) in these dialects, grammatical gender is preserved to varying degrees in the copula, third-person pronouns, verb endings, the numeral one, and a variety of other grammatical categories.

== Classification ==
Glottolog provides the following detailed classification of the Central Iranian languages within the Northwestern Iranian branch of the Iranian languages:

- Iranian
  - Central Iranian PBS
    - Central Iranian PB
      - Northwestern Iranian
        - Central Iran Kermanic
          - Kavir
            - Farvi
            - Garme'i
            - Khuri
            - Mihrijan
          - Nuclear Central-Kermanic
            - Gazic
              - Judeo-Esfahani
              - Ardestani
              - Gazi
              - Jarquya'i
              - Kafrudi
              - Kuhpa'i
              - Nohuji
              - Rudashti
              - Sedehi
              - Zefra'i
            - Judeo-Hamedani-Borujerdi
              - Judeo-Hamedani
              - Judeo-Borujerdi
            - Kashanic
              - Natanzic
                - Abyane'i
                - Badi (Median)
                - Badrudi
                - Bidhandi
                - Farizandi
                - Hanjani
                - Natanzi
                - Yarandi
              - Soic
                - Abuzaydabadi
                - Arani-Bidgoli
                - Delijani
                - Jowshaqani
                - Judeo-Kashani
                - Kamu'i
                - Kesha'i
                - Meyma'i
                - Nashalji
                - Qohrudi
                - Soi
                - Tari (Median)
                - Tarqi
              - Khunsaric
                - Judeo-Khomeini
                - Judeo-Khunsari
                - Khunsari
                - Mahallati
                - Vaneshani
              - Yazdi-Kermani-Nayini
                - Nayinic
                  - Abchuya'i
                  - Anarak
                  - Keyjani
                  - Nayini
                  - Tudeshki
              - Zoroastrian Yazdi
                - Gabri [Iranian]
                - Judeo-Yazdi-Kermani
                  - Judeo-Kermani
                  - Judeo-Yazdi
                - Parsi [Zoroastrian]
                - Zoroastrian Dari)
          - Sivandi

== Similarity to Sivandi ==
Sivandi, spoken in Sivand 75 km north of Shiraz, is the only Northwestern Iranian language in southern Iran. Sivandi shares many grammatical and lexical similarities with the Central Iranian dialects.

Sivandi	Ashtiani	Persian
varf	varfa	barf (snow)
esbe	esba	sag (dog)
varan	varan	bārān (rain)
gal	gal	-hā (plural suffix)

Sivandi	Khunsari	Persian
giyan	giyun	jān (life)
esbe	esba	sag (dog)
varan	varun	bārān (rain)
hame	hama	mā (we)
