= Judeo-Iranian languages =

Jewish variants of Iranian languages

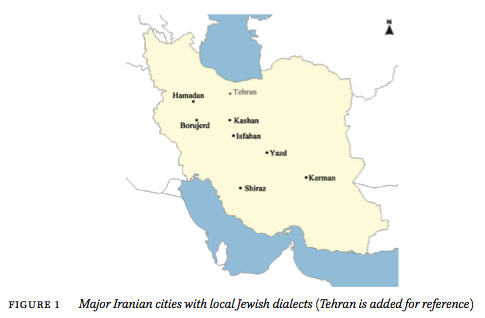
Iranian cities with local Jewish dialect

The Judeo-Iranian languages (or dialects) are a number of related Jewish variants of Iranian languages spoken throughout the formerly extensive realm of the Persian Empire. Judeo-Iranian dialects are generally conservative in comparison with those of their Muslim neighbours. Judeo-Shirazi, for example, remains close to the language of Hafez. Is this comparison including the more conservative Eastern Persian (Afghanistan, Tajikistan), or just Iranian Persian?

Like most Jewish languages, all the Judeo-Iranian languages contain great numbers of Hebrew loanwords, and are written using variations of the Hebrew alphabet. Another name used for some Judeo-Iranian dialects is Latorayi, sometimes interpreted by folk etymology as "not [the language] of the Torah". This refers to a form of the language in which the number of Hebrew and Aramaic loanwords is deliberately maximised to allow it to function as a secret code. In general, however, the number of such loanwords is small compared with that in other Jewish languages such as Yiddish or Judaeo-Spanish.

== Languages ==
The languages and dialects associated with Judeo-Iranian communities include the following. These varieties constitute a social rather than a single linguistic grouping. Most documented Judeo-Iranian dialects belong to the Northwestern Iranian group, while others are varieties of Persian or other Southwestern Iranian languages. Most of the local dialects are endangered or moribund because of migration to Tehran, Israel, and the United States, together with an increasing shift toward Persian, Hebrew, and English.

=== Northwestern Iranian languages ===
Judeo-Median, the unattested, hypothesized ancestor of the later Northwestern Iranian Jewish dialects.

  - Judeo-Hamedani, spoken in Hamadan and elsewhere in Hamadan province in western Iran. The Jewish Language Project estimated that it had approximately 10,000 speakers in 1900 but only a few dozen in 2023.
  - Judeo-Isfahani, spoken in Isfahan and its environs, as well as elsewhere in central and southern Isfahan province.
  - Judeo-Golpaygani, a Northwestern Judeo-Iranian language traditionally spoken by the Jewish community in the environs of Golpayegan and western Isfahan province. The earliest records of Jewish communities in the region have been dated to approximately 750 BCE. Judeo-Golpaygani was written in the Hebrew alphabet and contained numerous Hebrew loanwords. Following the decline and consolidation of the Persian Jewish community during the mid-twentieth century, Judeo-Golpaygani fell into disuse. It was reportedly replaced by Dzhidi, Judeo-Hamedani, and Persian among speakers remaining in Iran, and by English and Hebrew among emigrants to the United States and Israel.
  - Judeo-Nehevandi, spoken in Nahavand and elsewhere in northern Hamadan province. It is among the Judeo-Iranian dialects that have been documented and studied.
    - Judeo-Toyesarkani, associated with Tuyserkan. The Jewish Language Project has recorded a speaker of the language and is developing a Judeo-Tuyserkani dictionary.
  - Judeo-Borujerdi, spoken in Borujerd and elsewhere in Lorestan province. It is among the documented and studied Judeo-Iranian dialects, and a speaker recording has been made available through the Jewish Language Project.
    - Judeo-Khoramabadi, associated with Khorramabad.
  - Judeo-Khomeini, associated with Khomeyn.
  - Judeo-Khunsari, spoken in Khansar and elsewhere in far-western Isfahan province.
  - Judeo-Yazdi, traditionally spoken by Jews from Yazd. The Jewish Language Project estimated approximately 5,000 speakers in 1900 and between 200 and 700 in 2023. The dialect generally has penultimate stress and preserves ergative constructions in past-tense verbs. Historically, it was spoken in the northern Jewish neighborhood of Yazd, while descendants of migrants from Hamadan in the southern neighborhood spoke Persian with a Yazdi accent.
    - Judeo-Kermani, traditionally spoken by Jews from Kerman. It is very similar to Judeo-Yazdi because Jews from Yazd settled in Kerman during the nineteenth century.
  - Judeo-Kashani, spoken in Kashan, Abyaneh, and elsewhere in northern Isfahan province.
  - Judeo-Gilaki language
    - Judeo-Siahkali, spoken by Jews from Siahkal and reportedly in nearby Deylaman, Rasht, Lahijan, and Bandar Anzali. Sources specifically document Judeo-Siahkali as one of three Jewish dialects spoken in Rasht, alongside Judeo-Isfahani and Judeo-Kashani. The community was reportedly dispersed to Rasht and elsewhere following a pogrom and forced mass conversion to Islam. The dialect has been described as understudied and probably extinct.
    - Mashhadi Judeo-Gilaki, historically spoken by some Mashhadi Jews in Mashhad and later Mashhadi communities in Herat and Merv. It was also reportedly spoken in Kalat and elsewhere into the twentieth century. Kaganovich states that the largest group of Jews brought to Mashhad during the eighteenth century came from Gilan, resulting in Gilaki becoming the community's principal language; a dialect introduced by migrants from Yazd was also spoken. The community's ancestors were reportedly ordered to relocate specifically from Deylaman in Gilan to Khorasan. The language persisted after the forced conversion of the Jews of Mashhad to Islam in 1839. It is believed to have contained more Persian vocabulary than other Gilaki dialects and has been described as understudied and probably extinct.
- Kurdish is spoken or understood by many Kurdish Jews.
  - While no separate Judeo-Kurdish language has been attested, several Jewish Neo-Aramaic languages were traditionally spoken by Kurdish Jewish communities in Iranian Azerbaijan, Iranian Kurdistan, and Iraqi Kurdistan. Although associated with Kurdish Jewish communities, these are Semitic languages rather than Iranian languages.

=== Southwestern Iranian languages ===
Judeo-Persian, a group of Persian varieties traditionally written using the Hebrew alphabet and containing varying amounts of Hebrew and Aramaic vocabulary.

  - Dzhidi, a term used for literary Judeo-Persian.
  - Judeo-Shirazi, spoken in Shiraz and elsewhere in Fars province in southwestern Iran. The Jewish Language Project estimated approximately 10,000 speakers in 1900 and fewer than 200 in 2023. It describes the dialect as preserving features resembling the language of the fourteenth-century poet Hafez more closely than Standard New Persian does.
  - Bukhori, also called Judeo-Bukharic or Judeo-Tajik, the Jewish language traditionally associated with the community centered in Bukhara.

Juhuri, also called Judeo-Tat, a Jewish Tat variety spoken in the Republic of Azerbaijan and Dagestan in the North Caucasus.

Persian, spoken by the majority of Persian Jews in the twenty-first century.

=== Argots and secret languages ===
Luterāʾi, a secret language combining Aramaic and Hebrew vocabulary with Persian conjunctions and grammatical morphemes. The name and form of the jargon vary geographically: it is called Luflāʾi in Kashan, Lutrāʾi in Golpayegan, and Lutrūʾi in Kermanshah.

  - Luflāʾi, the Kashan variety of Luterāʾi.

== Language samples ==
Oral history in Judeo-Shirazi

Oral history in Judeo-Hamedani-Borujerdi

Oral history in Judeo-Esfahani

Oral history in Lishan Deni (Jewish Neo-Aramaic)

Oral history in Lishan Didan (Jewish Neo-Aramaic)

Oral history in Lishan Noshan (Jewish Neo-Aramic)

== See also ==
- Jews in Iran
- Jewish languages
