= Judeo-Kashani =

Jewish language variety from Iran

- Native to: Iran
- Language family: Indo-European: Iranian; Western; Northwestern; Central Iran Kermanic; Nuclear Central Iran Kermanic; Kashanic; Soic; Judeo-Kashani

Language codes
- ISO 639-3: –
- Glottolog: kash1276
- ELP: Judeo-Kashani

Judeo-Kashani (Hebrew:"כאשאנית יהודית"), also known as Kashi, is a variety of Judeo-Iranian spoken by the Jews of Kashan (Kāšān). Diachronically, Judeo-Kashani is a Median language, belonging to the Northeast branch of the Central Plateau Language Group spoken across Central Iran.

Judeo-Kashani is distinct from Persian (and Judeo-Persian for that matter) and bears typological similarity to the varieties spoken by Jewish communities in other cities such as Hamadan and Isfahan. Owing to the quick disappearance of the Jewish community from Kashan in the mid-twentieth century, Judeo-Kashani is only spoken by elder Kashani Jewish immigrants in North America and Israel, and it is moribund.

Kashani Jews currently use Persian as their native language. Those in diaspora are exposed to English in North America and Hebrew in Israel, to which new generations are shifting. The Jewish community of Kashan, like other Persian Jews., historically (until the 1930s) wrote in Judeo-Persian for religious, literary, and economic purposes. Judeo-Persian is simply the Persian language written in Hebrew script; it should not therefore be confused with Judeo-Kashani, which belongs to the Median branch of Iranian languages.

The term Jidi was the endomic name of Judeo-Kashani; this term has nothing to do with Judeo-Persian (a confusion practiced by various authoritative references, including Ethnologue).

== History ==
Nearly all of the cities in central Iran, including Kashan, had sizable Jewish populations before the mid-twentieth century, and these populations spoke their own varieties distinct from their non-Jewish, Persian-speaking neighbors. For example, while the Persian gloss for cat is gorbeh, the corresponding gloss in Judeo-Kashani is mel, which is identical to the glosses in Judeo-Isfahani and Judeo-Hamedani. The similarities between Judeo-Kashani, Judeo-Isfahani, and Judeo-Hamedani, and their differences from Persian, can be explained by the extensive historical contact and ties between the Jewish communities in Central Iran.

Following the mass emigration of Jews from Central Iran to Tehran and abroad, the Jewish population of Kashan dropped drastically from thousands in the 1940s to being gone by the end of the twentieth century. Now, Judeo-Kashani is only spoken by elder Kashani Jewish immigrants in North America and Israel, and it is moribund. According to Dr. Habib Borjian, a specialist in Iranian dialects and languages such as Judeo-Kashani, there are only dozens of Judeo-Kashani speakers, and with its speakers dispersed and opportunities to use it lost, Judeo-Kashani is close to completely vanishing. Most speakers now live in Israel or the United States, and they have shifted to using standard Persian or the dominant languages local to where they live. To document Judeo-Kashani and other endangered Jewish languages of Iran, organizations like the Endangered Language Alliance and the Jewish Language Project are working to film speakers and preserve their linguistic traditions.

== Phonology ==
Owing to the little existing documentation of Judeo-Kashani, as well as its endangered status, not much is known about its linguistic features. Judeo-Kashani is attested to have the vowels /i/, /e/, /a/, /u/, /o/, and /â/ – similar to Persian. The diphthongs are /aw/, /ow/, åw/, /eu/, /ay/, /ey/. Diphthongs are typically split when suffixed by a vowel in an ezafe construction, as seen through the alternation between xåu ('sleep') vs. xåv-i ('of sleep'). The constants of Judeo-Kashani are also similar to Persian, and they include /p/, /b/, /t/, /d/, /č/, /j/, /k/, /g/, /ḡ~q/, /f/, /v/, /s/, /z/, /š/, /x/, /h/, /m/, /n/, /r/, /l/, and /y/.

== Grammar ==
=== Nouns ===
Judeo-Kashani has both independent and enclitic pronouns. The enclitic pronouns are divided into two sets. Set I enclitics are used for intransitive verbs in the past tense as well as verbs in the present tense, and they ordinarily appear after the verb stem. Set II enclitics are used as agent markers for transitive verbs in the past tense, and they appear before the verb stem. The resulting differences in the morphology of intransitive verbs (with Set I enclitics following the stem) and transitive verbs (with Set II enclitics preceding the stem) is characteristic of an ergative construction, which Judeo-Kashani has retained. Texts from the late 19th century indicate that the language possessed grammatical gender during that period.

Pronouns in Judeo-Kashani
Pronouns/endings	Independent	Enclitic Set I	Enclitic Set II
1st person singular	mu(n)	-om/-ān	m
2nd person singular	tu	-e	d/t
3rd person singular	ovi/evi	-u (pres.), -ø (past)	š
1st person plural	hāmā	-im	mun
2nd person plural	šemā/šumā	-id	dun
3rd person plural	iāhā/yāhā/uyāhā	-end	šun

Demonstratives include i ('this'), u ('that'), itå ('this very'), utå ('that very'), índe/énde ('here'), uyå ('there'), yåhå/iåhå ('these'), and uyåhå ('those') – the latter two of which are the third person plural independent pronouns. In terms of prepositions, they include ber ('on'), der ('in'), dim ('on'), pali ('by, near'), ru ('on, in'), vå/bå ('with'), vase ('for'), ver(-e) ('at, by, near'), and xode ('with').

=== Verbs ===
Judeo-Kashani verbs are marked for person, through the enclitic pronouns above, and tense. Simple tenses include the present indicative, subjunctive, preterite, imperfect, and perfect. The future tense is formed by combining the stem -kem and the main verb's past stem. For example, the future tense of the verb våt ('to say') is kem-u våt ('he will say'). Judeo-Kashani also has preverbs, which are der-/dar-/da:-, vå-/va-, and ver-. Their function is to semantically modify the verb stem. For example, the verb āmed- ('come') can combine with the preverb der- to mean 'come in', or with bar- to mean 'come out'. To negate verbs, there is the prohibitive marker mé, as in meke ('do not!'). There is also the negative marker né, as in ne-dår-om ('I have not', present indicative)

Verb forms in Judeo-Kashani (1st person singular)
	Intransitive		Transitive	
	with preverb 'go'	with preverb 'fall'	with preverb 'do'	with preverb 'throw'
present	š-om	der-e-k-om	(e-)ker-om	der-e-xus-om
subjunctive	be-š-om	dar-k-om	(be-)ker-om	der-xus-om
imperative	be-š-id!	dar-k-e!	be-ke(r)!	ba-xus!
preterite	be-šud-om	dar-ket-om	ba-m-ke	der-em-xuss
imperfect	šud-om	dar-e-ket-om	m-e-ke	der-em-e-xuss
perfect	be-šude hom	dar-kete hom	ba-m-kerde	der-em-xusse
pluperfect	bešude budom	darkete budom	bamkerde bu	deremxusse bu
future	kem-em šu	kem-em ket	kem-em ke	kem-em xuss

== Example text ==
The following text is an excerpt from a set of letters written by local Jewish residents of Kashan, collected by Valentin Zhukovski in the mid-1880s.

Example text
Judeo-Kashani	English
1. axevī girōm, ō Rebbī-rō marūz edōrṓm. évvelō, ilṓhī, selōmet bīd. sōniyō her-gō jūyō bébīd ez rī-e lutf, selōmetī-i hōsil̮ū. ve dīger kōḡïz-i selōmetī-i šemō béresō. xūšhōl vṓbūdom.	Dear brother, Mr. Rabbi, to whom I am reporting. First of all, may you be flourishing. Then, should you kindly be inquiring, I am well. And then, the letter [informing me] of your well-being was received. I became happy. God willing, may you be happy and glorious in both worlds.
2. bōbet-i pīl umīd dōróm viss tūman berōt-rō déredundōde bū. umīd jinsehō dunbárūte bū. tevajjuh bakerī́d, her če vōménde bárūšīd. bōz jins-i xēb-ī peidō bekeróm, jahd-edūn resénim. hōl ītō báste be tavassut-i Mullō Šōlūm dáirīt. sīret-eš ez īn qarār̮ū.	As to the money, I should only hope that you have paid the twenty-tuman commission. I hope you have (lit. had) sold the merchandise. Be careful to sell whatever is left over. Should I find good commodities, I shall send [them] over to you. Now you should receive two boxes via Mulla Shalom. Here is the inventory...

== Works cited ==
Borjian, Habib (2012a), "Judeo-Kashani: A Central Iranian Plateau Dialect", Journal of the American Oriental Society, 132 (1): 1–21, doi:10.7817/jameroriesoci.132.1.0001, ISSN 0003-0279, JSTOR 10.7817/jameroriesoci.132.1.0001
