= Soi language =

Central Iranian language varieties of Iran

Soi
- Sohi, Soic
- Native to: Iran
- Native speakers: (7,030 cited 2000)
- Language family: Indo-European: Indo-Iranian; Iranian; Western; Northwestern; Central Iranian-Kermanic; Nuclear Central Iran Kermanic; Kashanic; Soic; Soi
- Dialects: Soi proper; Abuzaydabadi; Arani-Bidgoli; Delijani; Jowshaqani; Judeo-Kashani; Kamu'i; Kesha'i; Meyma'i; Nashalji; Qohrudi; Tari (Median); Tarqi

Language codes
- ISO 639-3: soj
- Glottolog: soii1239
- ELP: Soi

Soi (Sohi) is one of the Central Iranian language varieties of Iran, one of five listed in Ethnologue that together have 35,000 speakers. It is closely related to Natanzi.

== Dialects ==
=== Judeo–Kashani ===
There are very few native speakers as of 2012, most of whom are elderly and are located not in Kashan. The remaining speakers of Judeo–Kashani live in Jewish Kashani communities in North America and Israel. The language is similar to Judeo–Hamedani and Judeo–Isfahani. It has not appeared much in Jewish literature from the area, with most notable Jewish Kashani publications being published in either Judeo-Persian or Persian.
