= Nayini language =

Central Iranian language of Iran

Nayini
- Native to: Iran
- Native speakers: ~24,000 (2022)
- Language family: Indo-European: Iranian; Western; Northwestern; Central Plateau languages; Southeast Central Plateau; Nayini

Language codes
- ISO 639-3: nyq
- Glottolog: nayi1242
- ELP: Nayini
- Zefra'i

Nayini (Na'ini) is one of the Central Plateau languages varieties of Iran, with approximately 24,000 speakers.

There are other dialects or closely related languages, spoken in the vicinity that are also classified as Southeast Central Plateau such as Anāraki, Ābchuye’i, Keyjāni, Tudeshki, and Moshkenāni.

Ethnologue provisionally lists Khuri as a dialect. However, that appears to belong to a different branch of Northwestern Iranian.
