= Persid =

Persid may refer to:

- anything of or relating to Persis
- certain languages of the southwestern branch of the Western Iranian languages
