= Shuli dialect =

Persian dialect

Shuli Persian
- پارسی شولی
- Native to: Iran
- Region: Asia
- Ethnicity: Persians
- Language family: Indo-European: Indo-Iranian; Iranian; Western Iranian; Southwestern Iranian; Persian; Shuli Persian
- Writing system: Perso-Arabic alphabet

Language codes
- ISO 639-3: –

Shuli is one of the Persian languagedialects that is common among the Shuli Persians.
