= Judeo-Shirazi =

Dialects of Fars spoken by Jews of Shiraz, Iran

- Jewish Achomi
- Jidli
- Native to: Israel, Iran
- Native speakers: 200 (2023)
- Language family: Indo-European: Indo-Iranian; Iranian; Western; Southwestern; Dialects of Fars; Judeo-Shirazi
- Writing system: Hebrew

Language codes
- ISO 639-3: –
- Glottolog: jude1270
- ELP: Judeo-Shirazi

Judeo-Shirazi is a variety of the Fars language. Some Judeo-Shirazi speakers refer to the language as Jidi, though Jidi is normally a designation used by speakers of Judeo-Esfahani. It is spoken mostly by Persian Jews living in Shiraz and surrounding areas of the Fars province of Iran.

== History ==
Judeo-Shirazi is descended from Medieval Shirazi. It is estimated that in 1900 there were an estimated 10,000 speakers of Judeo-Shirazi, dropping to less than 200 in 2023. Like speakers of other Jewish-Iranian languages, many Judeo-Shirazi speakers emigrated to Israel or North America in the late 20th century. Today, around 4,000 individuals of Shirazi descent are living in Brooklyn, New York.

Unlike other Judeo-Iranian languages, Judeo-Shirazi has a history of literature.

== Vocabulary ==
Oral history of Judeo-Shirazi.

Unlike the other Judeo-Iranian languages, which are part of the Median languages, Judeo-Shirazi is a Southwest Iranian language, like Persian. Highlighting this are the lexical isoglosses Judeo-Shirazi exhibits, such as go- "say" and geyra "weeping". Despite this affiliation, Judeo-Shirazi is distinct from Persian in its grammar.

The following list of words indicates a few isoglosses distinguishing Judeo-Shirazi from the dialect of Judeo-Esfahani.

English	Esfahani	Judeo-Shirazi
Big	bele	gonde
Dog	kuδe	keleb
Cat	meli	gorbe
Shirt	perhan	piran
Throw	xuθ	ba-

== Features ==
Judeo-Shirazi displays several features of Southwest Iranian languages, as well as several features of Old Shirazi.

=== Grammar ===
Judeo-Shirazi displays split ergativity in the past tenses of transitive verbs. This feature is a common link between Fars varieties. Additionally, Judeo-Shirazi marks person in the past transitive using a proclitic, which otherwise functions as an oblique pronominal suffix. Other grammatical features of note:

- The preposition a, derived from Middle Persian ō, with a primary ablative function in Judeo-Shirazi, e.g., Isof-râ . . . a Mesr-eš mibren "they take Joseph to Egypt". Past participle marker -eθ- (< -est-), used in perfective forms: Judeo- Shirazi vâgešteθâ bodom "I had returned", cf. Davāni amesse beδe, "I had come".

=== Phonology ===
Judeo-Shirazi articulates sibilants (s, z) as intra-dental (θ, ð). Persian, and other Southwest Iranian languages, distinguish these phonemes. The systematic replacement of /s z/ by /θ ð/ in Judeo-Shirazi may be a result of two processes: the post-vocalic fricativatization found in other Fars dialects, like Davāni, and the original phoneme /θ/ stemming from proto-Shirazi.

Though it has been to some extent influenced by Persian, over the years, Judeo-Shirazi has remained relatively stable. Other phonological features contribute to evidence of its descendance from proto-Shirazi and other old Fars dialects:

- Judeo-Shirazi present stem toδ- (< toz-) "burn", attested in Medieval Shirazi texts as toz- and θoz-
- Judeo-Shirazi teš "louse", also attested in Medieval Shirazi and a number of dialects spoken to the south, southeast, and east of Shiraz, is rooted in proto-Iranian *tswiš(ā)-,
- Judeo-Shirazi tanȷ-̌ "drink" must correspond with Medieval Shirazi tanz-, which is defined by the cognate Persian word sanȷ-̌

Additional features similar to Fars dialects include the fronting of back vowels and final -a and -e.

== Status ==
Judeo-Shirazi is now Moribund with only 200 speakers as of 2023. The language is poorly documented but there is currently linguistic study being done by the Endangered Language Alliance, among the Shirazi Jewish community of New York.

== Sample Text ==
Judeo-Shirazi	Persian	English
har-kodom-ešu ešu–go dišna xow-e bad	har-kodâm-ešân goft-and dišab xâb-e bad	Both (lit. each) of them said: Last night we dreamed a bad dream
