= Sivandi language =

Central Iranian language of Fars province, Iran

Sivandi
- زووآن ئ سیوندی
- Native to: Iran
- Region: Fars province
- Native speakers: (3,000 cited 2000)
- Language family: Indo-European: Indo-Iranian; Iranian; Western Iranian; Northwestern; Central Iran-Kermanic; Sivandi

Language codes
- ISO 639-3: siy
- Glottolog: siva1239
- ELP: Sivandi

Sivandi, is a Northwestern Iranian language spoken in Sivand, located in Fars province, Iran. Despite its linguistic classification as a Northwestern Iranian language, it constitutes a geographic isolate functioning as a linguistic enclave entirely surrounded by Southwestern Iranian languages and various local Persian dialects.

== Classification ==
Sivandi is classified as a Northwestern Iranian language by Glottolog and Ethnologue:

- Iranian
  - Central Iranian PBS
    - Central Iranian PB
      - Northwestern Iranian
        - Central Iran Kermanic
          - Sivandi

== Grammar ==
Sivandi, along with Khuri and Farvi, is distinguished from the remaining Western Iranian languages by the notable development of the Proto-Iranian *hw to *f, for instance: hwahar -> far; sister.
