= Judeo-Marathi =

Indo-Aryan language

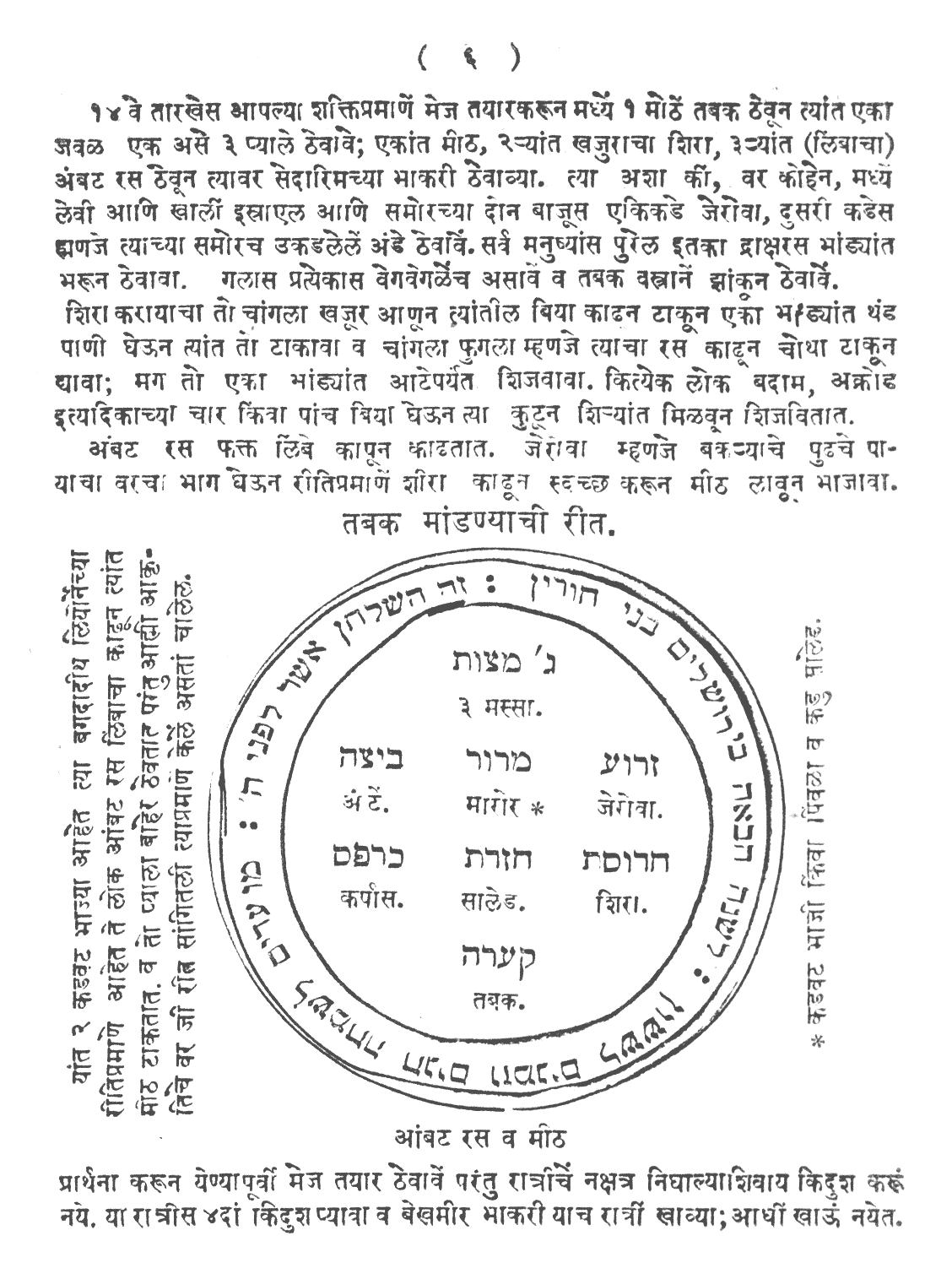
A page from a Haggada shel Pesah in Judaeo-Marathi which was printed in Mumbai in 1890.

Judeo-Marathi (Marathi: जुदाव मराठी) is an unattested variety of Marathi historically spoken by the Bene Israel of western India. There is no evidence that Judeo-Marathi substantially differs from other forms of Marathi. However, there are several manuscripts of Jewish texts written in Marathi using the Devanagari or Hebrew scripts. For instance, a Haggadah from 1911 contains Hebrew written in Devanagari, and a prayer book with instructions in Marathi written in the Hebrew script. In 2011, a Marathi-Hebrew text titled Poona Haggadah, was found in Salford. The 137-year-old book, which was used by the Bene-Israel community, was discovered by historian Yaakov Wise.

Currently, the Bene Israel community mainly resides in Israel, but some continue to live in Mumbai.

== Phonology ==
This section primarily covers Hebrew loanword phonology in Marathi. Since the Bene Israel community acquired the Hebrew language through European missionaries, the Hebrew transcriptions outlined below reflect Modern Hebrew pronunciation.

=== Consonants ===
==== Labial Consonants ====
Rule	Judeo-Marathi	Hebrew
[v] → [ʋ] when the Hebrew [v] corresponds to a vav ⟨ו⟩	लेवी [leʋi]	לֵוִי [levi]
[b] remains the same when the Hebrew [b] corresponds to a beth with a dagesh ⟨בּ⟩	राबी आकीबा [rabi akiba]	רַבִּי עֲקִיבָא [rabːi akiva]
[v] → [b] when the Hebrew [v] corresponds to a beth without a dagesh ⟨ב⟩	आबराहाम [abɾaham]	אַבְרָהָם [avraham]
[p] → [f] when the Hebrew [p] corresponds to a pe ⟨פּ⟩	फारो [faro]	פַּרְעֹה [paro]

==== Dental Consonants ====
Rule	Judeo-Marathi	Hebrew
[t] → [t̪] when the Hebrew [t] corresponds to a tav, with ⟨תּ⟩ and without the dagesh ⟨ת⟩	तोरा [t̪oɾa]	תּוֹרָה [tora]
[d] → [d̪] when the Hebrew [d] corresponds to a dalet ⟨ד⟩	आदाम [ad̪am]	אָדָם [adam]

==== Back Consonants ====
Rule	Judeo-Marathi	Hebrew
[ħ] → [h] when the Hebrew [ħ] corresponds to a chet ⟨ח⟩ or chaf ⟨כ⟩	राहासा [ɾahasa] बाहोर [bahoɾ]	רָחְצָה [raħtsa] בְּכוֹר [bəxor]
[x] → [kʰ] when the Hebrew [x] corresponds to a final kaf ⟨ך⟩	कारेख [korekʰ]	כּוֹרֵךְ [korex]

== Sample text ==
Davidachi Gite (Psalm of David)
Hebrew	English (KJV translation)	Judeo-Marathi	Transliteration
אַ֥שְֽׁרֵי־הָאִ֗ישׁ אֲשֶׁ֤ר ׀ לֹ֥א הָלַךְ֮ בַּעֲצַ֢ת רְשָׁ֫עִ֥ים וּבְדֶ֣רֶךְ חַ֭טָּאִים לֹ֥א עָמָ֑ד וּבְמוֹשַׁ֥ב לֵ֝צִ֗ים לֹ֣א יָשָֽׁב׃	Blessed is the man that walketh not into the counsel of the ungodly, nor standeth in the way of sinners, nor sitteth in the seat of the scornful	सुखि पुरुष तोचि जगी। दुष्टांचे ओ मत त्यागी॥ १ ॥ अहो पापियांचे मार्गी। उभा न रोहेची अंगी॥ २ ॥ आसन निंदकांचे। त्यागी कायामनवचे॥ ३ ॥	sukhi puruṣ toci jagī. duṣṭāñce o mat tyāgī. 1 aho pāpiyāñce mārgī. ubhā na rohecī aṅgī. 2 āsan nindkāñce. tyāgī kāyāmnavce. 3

== See also ==
- Judeo-Urdu
- Jewish languages
