= Jewish languages =

Languages and dialects developed in the Jewish diaspora

Jewish languages are the various languages and dialects that developed in Jewish communities in the diaspora. The original Jewish language is Hebrew, supplanted as the primary vernacular by Aramaic following the Babylonian exile. Jewish languages feature a syncretism of Hebrew and Judeo-Aramaic with the languages of the local non-Jewish population.

== Ancient history ==
Early Northwest Semitic (ENWS) materials are attested through the end of the Bronze Age—2350 to 1200 BCE. At this early state, Biblical Hebrew was not highly differentiated from the other Northwest Semitic languages (Ugaritic and Amarna Canaanite), though noticeable differentiation did occur during the Iron Age (1200–540 BCE). Hebrew as a separate language developed during the latter half of the second millennium BCE between the Jordan River and the Mediterranean Sea, an area known as Canaan.

The earliest distinctively Hebrew writing yet discovered was found at Khirbet Qeiyafa and dates to the 10th century BCE. The Israelite tribes established a kingdom in Canaan at the beginning of the first millennium BCE, which later split into the Kingdom of Israel in the north and the Kingdom of Judah in the south after a dispute of succession.

The kingdom of Israel was destroyed by the Assyrians in 722 BCE, and the kingdom of Judah was conquered by the Babylonians in 586 BCE, its higher classes exiled and the first Temple destroyed. Aramaic became the primary language of the Jews deported to Babylonia, with the first attestations of Jewish/Judean Aramaic found in scrolls from the 5th century BCE on the island of Elephantine. Later the Persians made Judah a province and permitted Jewish exiles to return and rebuild the Temple. Aramaic became the common language in the north of Israel, in Galilee and Samaria, though Hebrew remained in use in Judah with Aramaic influence.

Alexander the Great conquered Judah in 332 BCE, beginning the period of Hellenistic domination. During the Hellenistic period Judea became independent under the Hasmoneans, but later the Romans ended their independence, making Herod the Great their governor. One Jewish revolt against the Romans led to the destruction of the Second Temple in 70 CE, and the second Bar-Kochba revolt in 132–135 CE led to the expulsion of most of the Jewish population of Judea by the Romans. Biblical Hebrew after the Second Temple period evolved into Mishnaic Hebrew, which ceased being spoken and developed into a literary language around 200 CE. Hebrew remained in widespread use among diasporic communities as the medium of writing and liturgy, forming a vast corpus of literature which includes rabbinic, medieval, and modern literature prior to the revival of Hebrew as a spoken language.

== Development of Jewish varieties of languages ==
Jewish communities were dispersed around the world in the diaspora which followed the Jewish-Roman wars. Some adopted the languages of their neighbors, but many developed new varieties of these languages, collectively termed "Jewish languages". Various reasons led to the development of distinctive Jewish varieties of the languages of their non-Jewish host populations. Jews have often had limited exposure to non-Jewish society for various reasons, including imposed ghettoization (whether self-imposed separation or the forced creation of the ghetto by the host city) and strict endogamy, and as a result, Jewish languages diverged and developed separately from non-Jewish varieties in the territories they settled in. Due to frequent expulsions and migrations, single Jewish communities were often influenced by multiple distinct regional languages via language contact. For example, Yiddish, while based on Middle High German, has elements of Romance and Slavic. Jewish languages belong to a variety of genealogical language families, but these languages have common characteristics, making their study a distinct field of comparative linguistics known as Jewish linguistics.

The common feature between the Jewish languages is the presence of Hebrew and Judeo-Aramaic lexical components, stemming from the shared use of these languages in writing and liturgy. Many Jewish languages also display phonological, morphological, and syntactic features distinct from their non-Jewish counterparts. Most written Jewish languages are Hebraized, meaning they use a modified version of the Hebrew alphabet. These languages, unless they already have an accepted name (i.e. Yiddish, Ladino), are prefixed with "Judeo" (e.g. Judeo-Italian, Judeo-Arabic, Judeo-Persian, Judeo-Aramaic, Judeo-Marathi, Judeo-Malayalam, etc). Bukharan Jews spoke Bukhori, a dialect of Tajik, and Mountain Jews spoke Judeo-Tat.

In the early 20th century, secularism among Jews and large population shifts prompted the beginning of a shift from Jewish to non-Jewish languages. Even so, the majority of Jews in Eurasia and Africa, and many immigrants in North America and Palestine, still spoke Jewish languages. However, the Holocaust brought about a significant drop in the use of Jewish languages, especially Yiddish. Later, especially since the COVID-19 pandemic, learning Yiddish has begun to see a significant increase in popularity and interest, with studies revealing a surge in registration to online Yiddish language learning resources.

== Classification ==
Jewish languages are generally defined as the unique linguistic varieties of Jewish communities in the diaspora in their contact with surrounding non-Jewish languages. Languages vary in their distance and divergence from their non-Jewish sister languages. For example, Judeo-Yemeni Arabic is quite similar to some non-Jewish varieties of Yemeni Arabic, while Yiddish, a Germanic language, shows a high degree of dissimilarity to modern German dialects. Due to continued liturgical and literary use of Hebrew and Aramaic, Jewish communities were naturally in a state of diglossia. Along with their vernacular Jewish language, most Jews could read and write in Hebrew, which was necessary to fulfill the religious commandment to learn Torah and teach it. Jews were expected to also have knowledge of Judeo-Aramaic, the language of religious commentary (targumim) as well as many prayers, including the Kaddish. Hebrew, the "Holy Tongue", was the highest linguistic register in these communities, used for liturgy and study. Hebrew-Aramaic is the only adstratum shared by all Jewish languages. Some Jewish languages have multiple registers; for example, both Yiddish and Judezmo have three linguistic registers: colloquial, written, and scholarly-liturgical.

Some Jewish languages show the effects of the history of language shift among the speakers, including Hebrew-Aramaic influence. Yiddish exemplifies such a language. Some Jewish languages may become marked as distinctively Jewish because some shift affected some parts of the language as a whole. For example, what is today known as Baghdad Jewish Arabic (because it is the Arabic variety that was up until recently spoken by Baghdad's Jews) was originally the Arabic dialect of Baghdad itself and was used by all religious groups in Baghdad, but the Muslim residents of Baghdad later adopted Bedouin dialects of Arabic. Similarly, a dialect may be perceived as Jewish because its Jewish speakers brought the dialect of another region with them when they were displaced. In some cases, this may cause a dialect to be perceived as "Jewish" in some regions but not in others.

Some Jewish language varieties may not be classified as languages due to mutual intelligibility with their parent language, as with Judeo-Malayalam and Judeo-Spanish. In the case of Judeo-Spanish, also known as Ladino, linguistically it is a dialect of Spanish, mutually intelligible with other Spanish dialects and varieties, albeit with each Spanish dialect having loanwords and influences from different source languages: Nahuatl and Maya loanwords and influences for Mexican Spanish; Quechua and Aymara in Peruvian Spanish; Italian, Quechua and Guaraní in Argentinian Spanish; Maghrebi Arabic and Berber in "Ladino Occidental" (also known as Haketia); Levantine Arabic, Greek, Turkish and South Slavic in "Ladino Oriental".

In some cases, as with Judeo-Spanish, a register may be developed for Biblical translation and exegesis in which Hebrew-Aramaic patterns are frequently calqued, though the number of true Hebrew and/or Aramaic loanwords may be low. Another possibility is that Jews may speak the same language as their non-Jewish neighbors, but occasionally insert Hebrew-Aramaic or other Jewish elements. This is a transitory state in the shift from the use of Jewish to a non-Jewish language, often made in the context of assimilation. This occurred, for example, with many educated German Jews who transitioned from Western Yiddish to German. This variety of German, used between 1760 and the end of the 19th century (the Haskala), was written with the Hebrew alphabet, and contained a small number of Hebrew and Yiddish loans. An example is Moses Mendelssohn's translation of the Hebrew Bible into German written with Hebrew letters.

Judeo-Papiamento, the only living Jewish ethnolect endemic to the Americas and likely the only one that is also a creole language, has lexical differences from its non-Jewish counterpart that go beyond the influence of Hebrew and Aramaic. In formal contexts, Sephardic Jewish speakers of Papiamento tend to use extensive borrowing from French and Portuguese, whereas non-Jewish Curaçaoans mostly use Spanish loanwords in similar contexts.

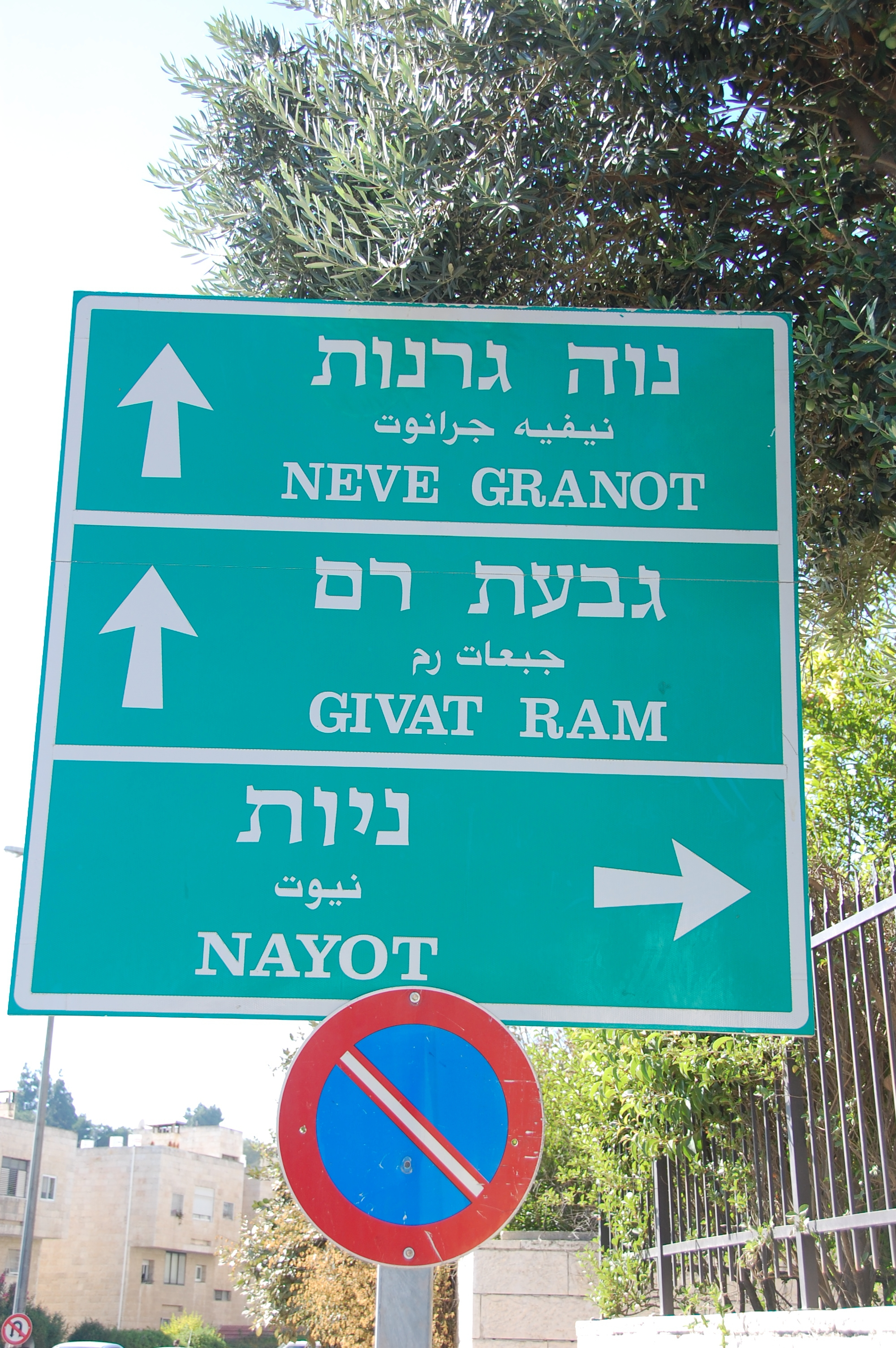
Signpost in Israel, showing directions in Hebrew, Arabic, and transliterated into Latin script.

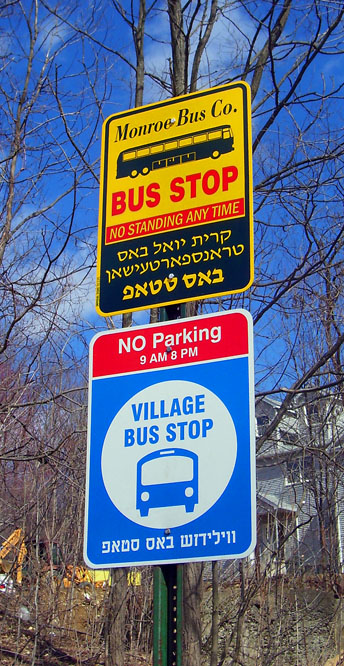
Signs in English and English transcribed into Hebrew characters in the predominantly Hasidic area of Kiryas Joel, New York

== Status ==
Among the most widely spoken Jewish languages to develop in the diaspora are Yiddish, Judeo-Spanish, and the Judeo-Arabic group of languages. Yiddish is the Judeo-German language developed by Ashkenazi Jews who lived in Central and Eastern Europe before World War II. Judeo-Spanish, also called Judezmo, Ladino and Muestra Spanyol, is the Judeo-Spanish language developed by Sephardic Jews who lived in the Iberian Peninsula before the expulsion by the Catholic Monarchs. Judeo-Catalan (also called Catalanic or Qatalanit), was the Jewish language spoken by the Jewish communities in Catalonia, Valencia, and the Balearic Islands. Judeo-Provençal and Judeo-Gascon were two Jewish varieties of Occitan language as it was historically spoken by French Jews.

Many ancient and distinct Jewish languages, including Judeo-Georgian, Judeo-Arabic, Judeo-Berber, Krymchak, Judeo-Italian, Judeo-Malayalam have largely fallen out of use due to the impact of the Holocaust on European Jewry, the Jewish exodus from Arab lands, the assimilation policies of Israel in its early days and other factors.

Yiddish was the language spoken by the largest number of Jews in the 1850s, but today the three most commonly spoken languages among Jews are English, modern Hebrew, and Russian—in that order. Yiddish, as well as several other Jewish languages, has contributed to the vocabulary of coterritorial non-Jewish languages, such as English or French.

Kol Yisrael, Israel's former public-service broadcaster, had long maintained short daily news and featured programming in many Jewish languages and dialects. For domestic audiences, it broadcast in Judeo-Iraqi Arabic on its Arabic network, while also producing in Yiddish, Judeo-Spanish, Judeo-Moroccan Arabic, Bukharian and Judeo-Tat for both domestic and overseas shortwave audiences in relevant areas. In addition, for over two decades starting in the late 1970s, a daily 30-minute shortwave transmission was made to Yemen in Judeo-Yemeni Arabic.

Radio Exterior de España, Spain's international public broadcaster, provides programming in Judeo-Spanish, which they refer to as Sefardi.

In the United States as well as in Birobidzhan, Russia, there are some local radio programs in Yiddish.

Judeo-Marathi (Marathi: जुदाव मराठी) is a form of Marathi spoken by the Bene Israel, a Jewish ethnic group that developed a unique identity in India. Judeo-Marathi, like other Marathi dialects, is written in the Devanagari script. It may not be sufficiently different from Marathi as to constitute a distinct language, although it is characterized by a number of loanwords from Hebrew and Aramaic as a result of influence from the Cochin Jewish community, as well as from Judeo-Malayalam, Portuguese and also some influence from the Urdu language.

== Alphabets ==
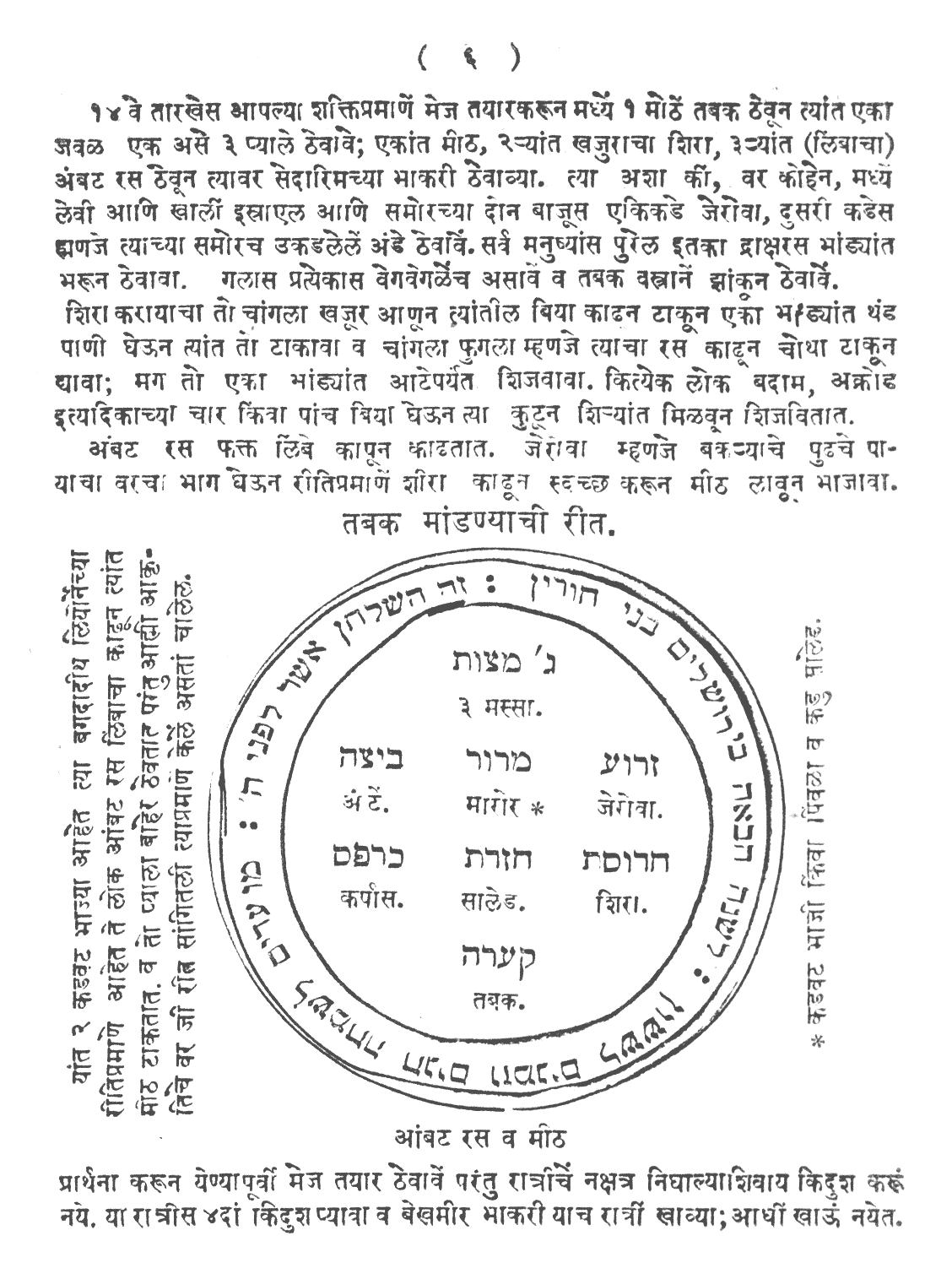
A page from a Haggada shel Pesah in Judeo-Marathi which was printed in Mumbai in 1890.

For centuries Jews worldwide spoke the local or dominant languages of the regions they migrated to, often developing distinctive dialectal forms or branching off as independent languages. The usual course of development for these languages was through the addition of Hebrew words and phrases used to express uniquely Jewish concepts and concerns. Often they were written in Hebrew letters, including the block letters used in Hebrew today and Rashi script.

Conversely, Judeo-Spanish, formerly written in Rashi script or Solitreo, since the 1920s is usually written in Turkey in the Latin alphabet with a spelling similar to that of Turkish, and has been occasionally printed in the Greek and Cyrillic alphabets.

Also, some Yiddish-speakers have adopted the use of the Latin alphabet, in place of the Hebrew alphabet. This is predominantly to enable communications over the internet, without the need for special Hebrew keyboards.

== See also ==
- List of Jewish diaspora languages
- Religiolect
- Para-Romani

== Bibliography ==
- Feldman, Rachel (2010). "Most ancient Hebrew biblical inscription deciphered". Archived from the original on 7 June 2011.
- Kahn, Lily; Rubin, Aaron D. (2016). Handbook of Jewish Languages. Leiden: Brill. ISBN 9789004345775.
- Sáenz-Badillos, Angel (1993). A History of the Hebrew Language. Cambridge University Press. ISBN 0-521-55634-1.
- Shanks, Hershel (2010). "Oldest Hebrew Inscription Discovered in Israelite Fort on Philistine Border". Biblical Archaeology Review. 36 (2): 51–6. Archived from the original on 2019-06-02.
- Steiner, Richard C. (1997), "Ancient Hebrew", in Hetzron, Robert (ed.), The Semitic Languages, Routledge, pp. 145–173, ISBN 0-415-05767-1
- Waltke, Bruce K.; O'Connor, M. (1990). An Introduction to Biblical Hebrew Syntax. Winona Lake, Indiana: Eisenbrauns. ISBN 0-931464-31-5.
- Zuckermann, Ghil'ad (ed.) 2014. Jewish Language Contact (International Journal of the Sociology of Language 226)
