= Judeo-Esfahani =

Variety of Judeo-Iranian languages from Isfahan, Iran

- Judeo-Isfahani, J̌idi
- Native to: Iran
- Native speakers: 2,000-7,000 (2023)
- Language family: Indo-European: Iranian; Western; Northwestern; Central Plateau; Southwest Central Plateau; Esfahān; Judeo-Esfahani
- Writing system: Hebrew, Persian

Language codes
- ISO 639-3: –
- Glottolog: jude1276

Judeo-Esfahani, also spelled Judeo-Isfahani, is a spoken variety of the Judeo-Iranian languages. It originated in Isfahan, Iran, and is used today in Israel and the United States. In 2023 there were an estimated 2,000-7,000 speakers of Judeo-Esfahani, compared to 100,000 in 1900.

Masouda speaking Judeo-Esfahani

== History ==
Judeo-Esfahani is part of the provincial (Velāyati) subgroup of the Judeo-Median languages, or dialects from the Northwest branch of Iranian. Similar to other Jewish dialects of Iranian, Esfahani was named for its city, Isfahan. Esfahani is therefore the language of Jews of Isfahan, and spoken primarily in the Jubāre region, where many Jews lived.

Many aspects of the Judeo-Iranian languages are unique to their regions, contributing to the lack of mutual intelligibility between these languages. Differences even arise between versions of Judeo-Esfahani in neighboring towns; the language spoken in Jubāre differed from that of Dardašt, an area with a smaller Jewish community. This variation was likely caused by language contact from a non-Judeo-Median language.

Today, more Isfahani Jews live in New York than Iran or Israel. The population clusters around Long Island, where other Persian Jews immigrated. However, Persian is the dominant language, used in the press and at synagogues. Judeo-Esfahani is mostly limited to domestic use, especially if both parents are Isfahani, though children in general are more likely to use Persian to communicate.

== Vocabulary ==
Esfahani often diverges from other dialects in its vocabulary.

English	Esfahani	Judeo-Shirazi	Yazdi
Large	bele	gunda	mas, gondo
Cat	meli	gorba	gorbo

== Writing system ==
None of the Judeo-Median languages have a standardized written form. However, modern speakers have written texts in Judeo-Esfahani using the Hebrew or Persian writing systems.

The only literature in Judeo-Isfahani is folklore. The širâ, or communal songs, comprise a significant portion of this.

== Phonology ==
The syllabic structure of Judeo-Esfahani is (C)V(C). Consonant clusters may not appear in the onset, and though they are allowed in the coda, they are avoided. The language permits up to and at least five-consonant clusters, as in: baynš.tâ [ˈbæɲʃ.tɑ] ‘five (units).’

=== Consonants ===
Judeo-Esfahani is not mutually intelligible with other Jewish dialects of Iranian. One reason for this is pronunciation. Esfahani Jews pronounce the standard /s/ and /z/ as /θ/ and /δ/. Some speakers of Judeo-Shirazi and Kashani also follow these pronunciation rules. This pronunciation change is a distinct characteristic of Judeo-Esfahani; it represented language contact with non-Jewish Esfahanis who only spoke Persian and subsequent borrowing from their language.

There are a few instances to note regarding consonants:

- The pharyngeal consonants exist in Judeo-Esfahani, but not in all speakers. The pharyngeal stop optionally occurs in words with Semitic origins, for example.
- Pharyngeal ḥ [ħ] is an allophone of /h/ and most often occurs in loanwords from Arabaic and Hebrew. It can also exist in words native to Judeo-Esfahani, though more rarely, in cases like perḥan ‘shirt.’
- Like in Persian, q and ġ comprise one uvular phoneme with three allophones ([q], [ɢ], [ʁ]).
- Intervocalic /v/ ranges between [v], [β], and [ʋ].
- Due to the voicing of š near d, /ž/ [ʒ] can only appear in the [ʒd] sequence.

=== Vowels ===
Vowel lengthening in Judeo-Esfahani is common, and a product of various factors, such as diachronic elision, synchronic elision, and the coalescing of created geminate vowels at morpheme boundaries. Vowel lengthening is also common in the verbal past tense, with /â/ and /a/ or /e/ becoming /aa/ or /aː/. Emphatic lengthening is also seen, but no semantic or etymological reason foregrounds this. The distribution of this type of lengthening needs further research.

=== Diphthongs ===
All diphthongs in Judeo-Esfahani are a product of lenition. A few specific rules also apply. The [ou] diphthong decomposes postvocalically, seen in ov-e lop [o.ve.lop] ‘saliva.’ Additionally, the [eu] diphthong breaks if followed by a vowel, as in šav-e dišabbât, ‘Sunday night.’

=== Stress ===
Nouns in Judeo-Esfahani carry final-syllable stress by default. There is, however, an exception: a closet set of words do not conform to the rule. This set includes ágar, ‘if’, ámmâ, ‘but’, and xéyli, ‘many.’ The pattern is more complex in verbs. Below is a list, from Borjian, of which morpheme(s) or syllable(s) receive stress:

- the negation morphemes: ná=šun=di ‘they didn’t see,’ ve-mé-roθ ‘don’t get up!’
- the person endings in present-future: owθ-ún-e ‘I (will) sleep’
- the subjunctive prefix: bi-́ gir-ind ‘that they seize,’ bé-tarθ ‘fear!’
- the preverbs: vé-roθ ‘get up!,’ i=́ šun=gift ‘they seized’
- the first syllable in the preterit: b-úmâ-wn ‘I came,’ bi=́ š=di ‘he saw’
- either the perfective prefix or participial element: búnde/bundé ‘he has come,’ bé=šun=baθθé bo ‘they had hit,’ ió fde/yofdé bown ‘we had slept’
- often by the stem in the intransitive imperfect: nišdé-ym-e ‘we would sit,’ xandấ-ym-e ‘we used to laugh’
- the first syllable in the transitive imperfect: vấte=mun=e ‘we would say’; the stress is imperceptible in ‘regular’ stems: tarθenaa=m=e ‘I used to scare’.

== Grammar ==
Nouns in Judeo-Esfahani do not have case, gender, or class. They do, however, have suffixes and clitics that serve similar purposes:

- plural marker -ấ, as in barấ ‘doors’
- definite marker -é, as in baré ‘the door’
- indefinite marker =i, as in bári ‘a door’
- accusative marker (r)â, as in bárâ ‘door’ (direct object)
- pronominal clitics, as in bárod ‘your door’.

Descended from Median, rather than Old Persian, Judeo-Esfahani is part of the Central dialects of Northwestern Iran. Esfahani exhibits the Northwestern Iranian /z/ rather than the Proto-Iranian *dz reflex.

Definiteness is usually marked on nouns using the stressed suffix -e, while indefiniteness is marked by the number ye(y) ‘one.’ The definite marker can be applied to the subject or combined with an object marker on a definite direct object. In general, Judeo-Esfahani exhibits definiteness marking that is similar to standard Persian, except for ergative constructions in past transitive tenses:

- ye moʾallém=om bidi, I saw a teacher.
- moʾallemé=m bidi, I saw the teacher.

Past tense morphology differs between dialects.

=== Pronouns ===
Judeo-Esfahani has two sets of pronouns, independent (subject) and enclitic (oblique). They can also be used as objects when -(r)â is added to the subject set.

Enclitic pronouns are used in genitive phrases as pronominal clitics, and also function as person markers in ergative past tense transitive verb constructions as agent clitics. Pronominal clitics are also used in experiencer constructions as the subject. Additionally, Judeo-Esfahani only has prepositions, many of which have been influenced by language contact with Persian.

=== Adjectives and Adverbs ===
Adjectives generally follow their noun. Sometimes, attributive and superlative forms are created using suffixes -tar and -tarin respectively, but it is more common for them to be formed with preposition aδ/eδ. Adverbs have three-way deixis, noting proximal ‘here,’ distal ‘there.’ and indefinite distal ‘there.’

=== Numerals ===
The unstressed suffix -tâ seen on many numerals is an optional count noun that can be applied to all numbers but ‘one.’ Adding this suffix makes the noun phrase indefinite. When a number is substantivized, the suffix becomes stressed.

=== Verbs ===
Verbs may contain these parts:

- ternary stems: present and past stems, as well as the past participle, which is used in the imperfect and present perfect
- lexical preverbs in some verbs
- imperfective/durative suffix -e, used in the present indicative and the imperfect
- perfective be, used in the preterit and present perfect
- subjunctive be, used in the present subjunctive, imperative, and optative moods
- negation na- and prohibitive ma
- personal endings: sg. 1 -un/-on/-om, 2 -e/-i, 3 -u (pres.), -∅ (past); pl. 1 -im, 2 -id/-it, 3 -end, used in present tenses and intransitive past forms
- agent clitics (AC):21 sg. 1 =m, 2 =d, 3 =š; pl. 1 =mun, 2 =dun, 3 =šun, used in transitive past forms, with the option of fronting to a preceding word.

There are 10 verb forms in Judeo-Esfahani. The language also has a ternary system of verb stems typical to other Iranian languages. However, when the past participle precedes verb endings, there is some variation in terms of stress and lengthening. If the normal past tense stem is allowed, stress is what indicates tense. Lengthening appears to apply unsystematically.

Additionally, note that the optative mood is only possible in the third person singular. Infinitives are also possible and are formed by adding either -(â)mún or -án to the past stem. The choice of which to add seems to be speaker dependent. Verbs are negated using stressed markers na-/ne- for negation and ma-/me for prohibition. These markers coexist alongside other preverbs.

Judeo-Esfahani exhibits split ergativity on the past tenses of transitive verbs. Further, intransitive light verbs that have a nominal component are treated as ergative if their auxiliary verb is transitive.

Interrogatives use the subjunctive forms of the copula but only when the tense is present, and the subject is animate. The rule does not apply to other cases, where question words or change of intonation would be used instead.
