= Abuzaydabadi dialect =

Language of people in Abuzaydabad, central Iran

Abuzaydabadi
- Buzabadi
- Native to: Iran
- Region: Abuzeydabad
- Ethnicity: Soi
- Language family: Indo-European: Indo-Iranian; Iranian; Western; Northwestern; Central Iran Kermanic; Nuclear Central Iran Kermanic; Kashanic; Soic; Abuzaydabadi

Language codes
- ISO 639-3: None (mis)
- Glottolog: abuz1234

Abuzaydabadi (Persian: ابوزیدآبادی) is a dialect of Soi and the language of people in the Kashan County, specifically the village of Abuzeydabad and the surrounding villages. It is part of the Central group of Iranian dialects.

== Grammar ==
The nominal system of the language is based on two genders, masculine and feminine; two numbers, singular and plural and case, similar to other central dialects.
