= Anaraki =

Anaraki انارکی
- village
- Location within Iran
- Coordinates: 32°55′46″N 48°23′01″E
- Country: Iran
- Province: Khuzestan
- County: Andimeshk
- Bakhsh: Alvar-e Garmsiri
- Rural District: Qilab

Population (2006)
  - Total: 87
- Time zone: UTC+3:30 (IRST)
  - Summer (DST): UTC+4:30 (IRDT)

Anaraki (Persian: انارکی, also Romanized as Anārakī) is a village in Qilab Rural District, Alvar-e Garmsiri District, Andimeshk County, Khuzestan Province, Iran. At the 2006 census, its population was 87, in 14 families.
