= Zoroastrian Dari language =

Northwestern Iranian ethnolect

Zoroastrian Dari
- Gabri
- Yazdi
- Native to: Central Iran
- Region: Yazd and Kerman
- Native speakers: (8,000 cited 1999)
- Language family: Indo-European: Iranian; Western; Northwestern; Central Plateau languages; Southeast Central Plateau; Zoroastrian Dari language

Language codes
- ISO 639-3: gbz
- Glottolog: zoro1242
- ELP: Zoroastrian Dari; Judeo-Yazdi

Zoroastrian Dari (Persian: دری زرتشتی), also known as the Behdinan dialect (گویش بهدینان) and often simply known as Dari, is a Northwestern Iranian language, and specifically a variety of the Central Plateau languages. This language has been described as an ethnolect.

Zoroastrian Dari used to be spoken by almost a million people in central Iran, up until the 1880s. Nowadays, it is used as a first language by an estimated 8,000 to 15,000 Zoroastrians in and around the cities of Yazd and Kerman in central Iran, and by the Irani community in India.

It is also known as Behdīnānī or sometimes pejoratively as Gabrī (sometimes Gavrūnī or Gabrōnī). It has numerous dialects.

== Genealogy ==
Genealogically, Zoroastrian Dari is a member of the Northwestern Iranian language subfamily, which includes several other closely related languages, for instance, Kurdish, and Balochi. These Northwestern Iranian languages are a branch of the larger Western Iranian language group, which is, in turn, a subgroup of the Iranian language family.

== Name ==
The language known as Zoroastrian Dari is also referred to as 'Behdinâni' ("language of the people of good religion") or pejorative name, 'Gabri' ("language of the infidels"), derived from 'Kafir' ("infidels", referring to the non-Muslims). The roots of the name 'Gabri' date back to the Islamic invasion of Iran and are resented by speakers of Dari to refer to their ethnolect.

== Dialects ==
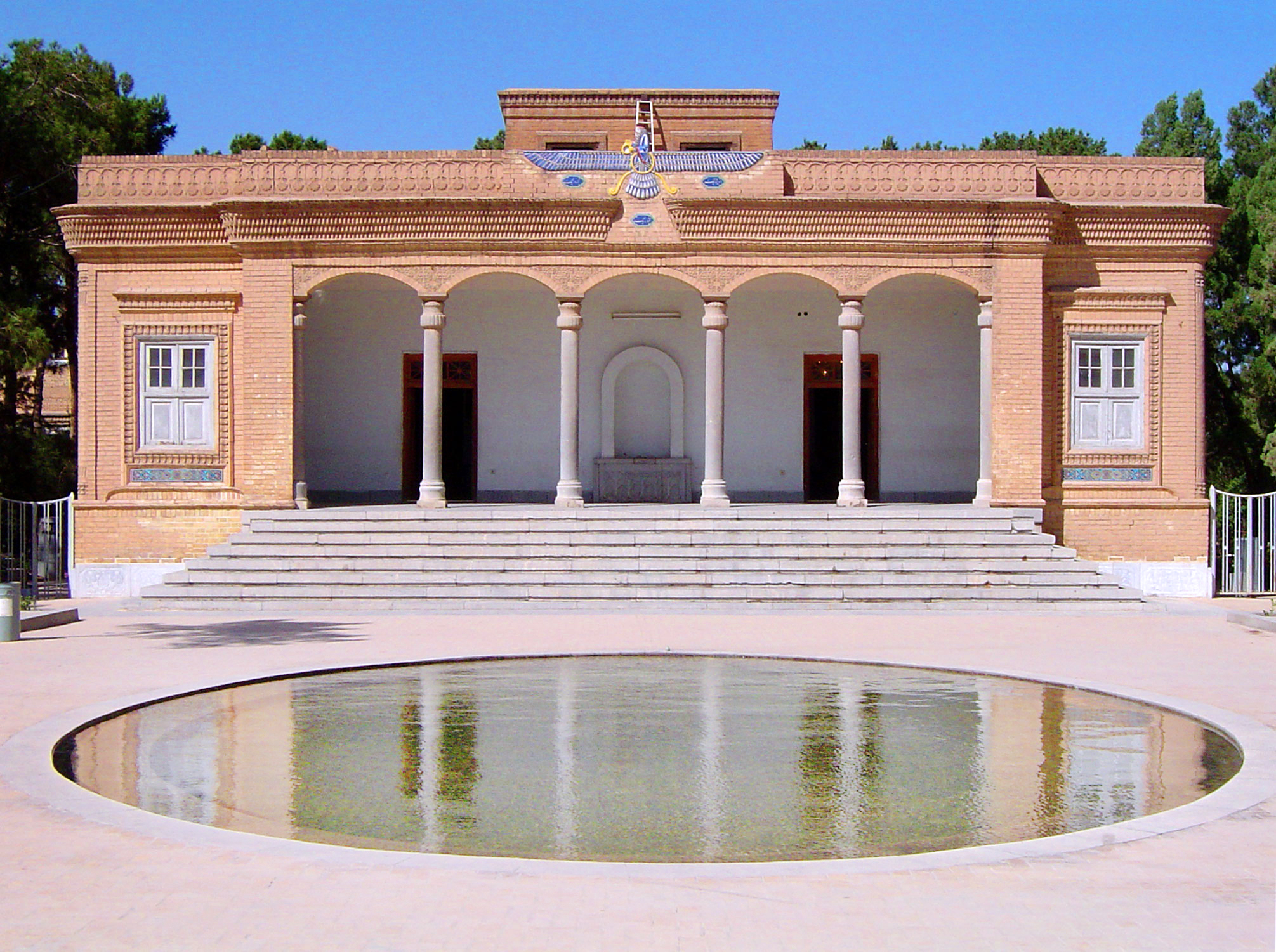
The main Zoroastrian fire temple in Yazd, Iran.

According to Farudi and Toosarvaredani, Dari is traditionally divided into two main dialects: the variety spoken in Yazd and the one spoken in Kerman. However, this division of the ethnolect conceals the complexity of the actual dialectical situation. The Yazdi dialect has approximately thirty varieties, each distinct and unique to one of the Zoroastrian neighborhoods in and around Yazd. Were it not for the geographic proximity of the Yazdi dialects, they would be classified as distinct dialects. The Kermani dialect may also contain (or may have contained at one time) a comparable level of dialectical complexity.

== Endangered status ==
The pressures affecting the vitality of Zoroastrian Dari today are largely economic. In order to obtain an economic advantage, speakers are giving up their language for the dominant lingua franca of Iran, Persian. Parents intentionally do not transmit Zoroastrian Dari to their children in order that they may have what is felt to be an advantage in school and in life. The ethnolect loss can also occur more indirectly and less visible when people move to larger urban centers or abroad in pursuit of better economic opportunities; the lack of a complete ethnolect environment in which to immerse a child decreases or completely inhibits the transmission of the ethnolect to new generations.

In past times, Zoroastrian Dari speakers experienced political pressures to yield up their ethnolect as well. The period since the seventh-century Muslim conquest of Persia has been a time of great persecution for the Zoroastrians of Iran. Political pressures have directly resulted in language loss when Zoroastrians have deliberately abandoned their ethnolect as a means of hiding their religion so as to escape persecution. Political pressures have also led to language loss indirectly; the oppression the Zoroastrians have been experienced under Iran's rulers has driven a steady stream of Zoroastrians to more tolerant areas, mostly the capital, Tehran. Again, an environment where the ethnolect is spoken does not exist in these places, inhibiting the transmission of Dari to new generations.

Linguists currently consider Dari to be in a state of language shift. Many of the language's speakers have assimilated to the dominant dialect and have given up—intentionally or unintentionally—their traditional ethnolect. Ethnolects like Dari are transferring from a state of maintenance, in which an etholect is being sustained in the face of pressure from a dominant dialect, to extinction, a state in which the ethnolect is no longer spoken.

Many of Dari's dialects are facing extinction at an even more rapid pace than the language as a whole. Since each of Dari's many dialects has a smaller community of speakers, they are more susceptible to the forces driving the language towards extinction. Some dialects have already effectively reached extinction, for example, the Mohammadabad dialect, which, it is reported, possesses only a few speakers living in Tehran. The Kerman dialect, always susceptible because of the smaller size of its Zoroastrian population, also seems to be largely lost.

== See also ==
- Zoroastrians in Iran

== Bibliography ==
- Cahill, Michael; et al., eds. (2001), "Language Family Tree for Northwestern Iranian languages", Ethnologue: Languages of the World, 14th ed., Dallas: SIL
- Farudi, Annahita; Toosarvandani, Maziar Doustdar (2003), The Dari Language Project: 2003 Fieldwork Endeavor: Summary of Findings (PDF), archived from the original (PDF) on February 4, 2007
- Farudi, Annahita; Toosarvandani, Maziar Doustdar (2004), The Dari Language Project: 2004 Fieldwork Endeavor: Summary of Findings (PDF), Berkeley: UC Berkeley/linguistics.berkeley.edu, archived from the original (PDF) on November 15, 2017
- Farudi, Annahita; Toosarvandani, Maziar Doustdar (2005), "The Loss of Ergativity in Dari Modal Verbs", in McNay, Anna (ed.), Oxford Working Papers in Linguistics, Philology & Phonetics, pp. 149–160
- Farudi, Annahita; Toosarvandani, Maziar Doustdar (2007), "About Dari", Dari Language Project, Berkeley: UC Berkeley/linguistics.berkeley.edu, archived from the original on June 27, 2019
- Gholami, Saloumeh; Farahmand, Armita (2016). Zoroastrian Dari (Behdini) in Kerman. Girona: Sociedad de Estudios Iranios y Turanios. ISBN 978-84-608-3087-0.
- Ringer, Monica M. (January 2012). Amanat, Abbas; Vejdani, Farzin (eds.). Iranian Nationalism and Zoroastrian Identity; Between Cyrus and Zoroaster (First ed.). Iran Facing Others; Identity Boundaries in a Historical Perspective: Palgrave Macmillan. ISBN 978-0-230-10253-8.
