= Natanzi language =

Central Iranian language of Iran

Natanzi
- Natanzic
- Native to: Iran
- Native speakers: (several thousand cited 2000)
- Language family: Indo-European: Indo-Iranian; Iranian; Western; Northwestern II; Tatic; Kermanic/Central Plateau; Northeastern; Kashanic; Natanzi
- Dialects: Natanzi proper; Abyane'i; Badi (Median); Badrudi; Bidhandi; Farizandi; Hanjani; Yarandi

Language codes
- ISO 639-3: ntz
- Glottolog: nata1252
- ELP: Natanzi

Natanzi is one of the Central Iranian varieties of Iran, one of five listed in Ethnologue that together have 35,000 speakers. Dialects are Natanzi, Farizandi, Yarandi/Yarani. It is closely related to Soi.
