= Khunsari language =

Indo-Iranian language

Khansari
- Khusaari
- Native to: Iran
- Native speakers: (21,000 cited 2000)
- Language family: Indo-European: Indo-Iranian; Iranian; Western; Northwestern II; Central Iranian Languages; Northwestern; Khansari

Language codes
- ISO 639-3: kfm
- Glottolog: khun1255
- ELP: Khunsari

Khunsari dialect (Persian: گویش خوانساری) is a Central dialect within the Northwestern Iranian languages, spoken in Khansar, a town in the west of Isfahan province of Iran. Some of the oldest isoglosses include the development of Aryan palatals to fricatives: OIr. *dz > z: mossar "big", kissar "small", heze "yesterday", zun- "know", zumā "son-in-law" (but yešt "ugly" < SW *a-dushta-, cf. NPers. zesht < NW *a-zushta- "unloved"); *tsw > sp: isba, espa "dog" (< Median spaka-), espid "white", ešpiž "louse".
