= Bukharian language =

Judeo-Persian dialect of Central Asia

Bukharian
- בוכארי, Бухорӣ, Buxorī
- Native to: Uzbekistan, Tajikistan, Afghanistan
- Ethnicity: Bukharan Jews
- Native speakers: 117,840 in all countries (2018–2019)
- Language family: Indo-European: Indo-Iranian; Iranian; Western; Southwestern; Persian; Eastern Persian; Tajik; Bukharian
- Writing system: Hebrew, Cyrillic, Latin

Official status
- Recognised minority language in: None

Language codes
- ISO 639-3: bhh
- Glottolog: bukh1238
- ELP: Bukhori

Bukharian, also known as Judeo-Bukharic and Judeo-Tajik (autonym: Bukhori, בוכארי, Бухорӣ, Buxorī), (Note: Also known as Judeo-Tadzhik, Bukhari, Bukharic, Bukharan and Bukharit.) is a Judeo-Persian dialect historically spoken by the Bukharan Jews of Central Asia. It is a Jewish dialect derived from—and largely mutually intelligible with—the Eastern Persian varieties of Tajiki and Dari.

== History ==
Historically, Bukharian was spoken by Jews in Central Asia. The language classification of Bukharian is as follows: Indo-European > Indo-Iranian > Iranian > West Iranian > Southwest Iranian > Persian > Tajik > Bukharian.

Bukhori is based on Classical Persian, with a large number of Hebrew and Aramaic loanwords. Over time, a small number of loanwords from other surrounding languages including Uzbek, Russian, and Arabic were added to the language.

In 1987, the total number of speakers was 85,000. In the USSR, there were 45,000 speakers; in Israel, there were 32,000; and in all other countries combined, there were 3,000. Ethnic Tajik minorities exist in many countries, such as Afghanistan, China, Pakistan and Uzbekistan. Samarkand and Bukhara are two cities in Uzbekistan which are particularly densely populated by Tajik speakers, among whom were tens of thousands of Bukharan Jews in the 19th to 20th centuries. (In modern times, the dialects spoken by the few remaining Jews in these cities barely differ, if at all, from their non-Jewish counterparts.)

Like most Jewish languages, Bukhori traditionally used the Hebrew alphabet. But throughout the past century, due to the influence of various empires and ideologies, Bukhori was written using the Latin alphabet in the 1920s and 1930s, then Cyrillic from 1940 onwards. The Hebrew alphabet fell further into disuse outside of Hebrew liturgy when the Bukharian Jewish schools were closed in Central Asia and Bukharian Jewish publications, such as books and newspapers, began to appear using the Cyrillic alphabet. Today, many older Bukharian Jews who speak Bukharian only know the Cyrillic alphabet when reading and writing Bukharian. The origin of its respective spelling system is Talmudic orthography.

Early in the Soviet period, Soviet authorities wanted Hebrew to be the language of culture and instruction for Jews in the Turkestan Autonomous Soviet Socialist Republic and in the Bukhara People's Soviet Republic. In late 1921, the Turkestani People's Commissariat of Education ordered that schools for Bukharian Jews teach in Bukharian and not in Hebrew. In 1934, 15 Bukharian Jewish clubs and 28 Bukharian Jewish red teahouses in Uzbekistan existed. However, in 1938, Bukharian was no longer used as the language for instruction in schools and cultural activities; instead, it became mainly spoken at home.

== Revival ==
Attempts were made to bring about a revival of Bukharian Jewish culture in the Soviet Union. One significant attempt was the establishment of a council for Bukharian Jewish literature in the Uzbekistan Writers’ Union, headed by Aharon Shalamaev-Fidoi (who emigrated to Israel in 1991). Another significant attempt was the Hoverim society established in Tajikistan and headed by Professor Datkhaev (Datkhaev emigrated to the US in 1992). The main organizational supporter for Bukharian Jewish culture today is the World Bukharian Jewish Congress, which aims to teach and spread awareness of the history, culture, language, and literature of the Bukharian Jews. Based on the Soviet census of 1979, 20% more Central Asian Jews spoke Russian than Bukharian.

Among some Bukharian Jewish youth, especially in the New York City area, there has been a revival of using the Bukharian Jewish language written in a modified Latin alphabet similar to the one developed by Bukharian Jewish linguist and writer, Yakub Kalontarov. Today, youth learning the Bukharian Jewish language sponsored by the Achdut-Unity Club in Queens use the modified Latin alphabet.

Classes on Bukharian Jewish history and the Bukhori language are also available at Queens College since 2010, marking the first time that Bukhori has been taught in an American university. The classes are taught by Bukharian adjunct professor Imanuel Rybakov. Rybakov has also authored a guide to learning the Bukharian language for English speakers.

== Orthography ==
Bukharian historically used the Hebrew alphabet (called Eastern Rashi in writing and square script in printing). From 1928 to 1940, the written Bukharian language in the USSR used the Latin alphabet.

The first version of the Latin alphabet for the language was compiled in April 1928 and had the following order:

a в d ә l n s r k m h t u x ş f p g o v z ⱨ ƣ q e c ç i j ə̦ ƶ

In 1930, changes were made to the alphabet: capital letters were introduced, the letter ⟨ə̦⟩ was eliminated, and the letter ⟨Ů ů⟩ was introduced. At a spelling conference in August 1934, the letter ⟨Ⱨ ⱨ⟩ was removed from the alphabet and the letter ⟨Ů ů⟩ was replaced by ⟨Ū ū⟩. On February 5, 1935, this decision was legalized by order No. 112 of the People's Commissariat of Education of the Uzbek SSR.

As a result, the later version of the Soviet Latin alphabet had the following order:

A a, B в, C c, Ç ç, D d, E e, F f, G g, Ƣ ƣ, H h, I i, J j, K k, L l, M m, N n, O o, P p, Q q, R r, S s, Ş ş, T t, U u, Ū ū, V v, X x, Z z, Ƶ ƶ, Ə ə

Currently, printed literature in the Bukharian Judeo-Tajik dialect is published mainly in Cyrillic. Some works also use the Latin alphabet, which is close to the Uzbek one.

Current Cyrillic alphabet:

А а, Б б, В в, Г г, Д д, Е е, Ё ё, Ж ж, З з, И и, Й й, К к, Л л, М м, Н н, О о, П п, Р р, С с, Т т, У у, Ф ф, Х х, Ц ц, Ч ч, Ш ш, Ъ ъ, Э э, Ю ю, Я я, Ғ ғ, Ӣ ӣ, Қ қ, Ӯ ӯ, Ҳ ҳ, Ҷ ҷ

Current Latin alphabet:

A a, B в, C c, Ch ch, D d, E e, F f, G g, Gh gh, H h, I i, J j, K k, L l, M m, N n, O o, P p, Q q, R r, S s, Sh sh, T t, Ts ts, U u, U' u', V v, X x, Y y, Yi yi, Z z, Zh zh'

Comparative table
Cyrillic	Latin (USSR)	Latin (Uzbekistan)	Hebrew
А а	A a	A a	א
Б б	B в	B b	בּ
В в	V v	V v	ב
Г г	G g	G g	ג
Д д	D d	D d	ד
Е е	E e	Ye ye	יה
Ё ё	Jo jo	Yo yo	יו
Ж ж	Ƶ ƶ	Zh zh	'ג
З з	Z z	Z z	ז
И и	I i	I i	א
Й й	J j	Y y	י
К к	K k	K k	כּ
Л л	L l	L l	ל
М м	M m	M m	מ
Н н	N n	N n	נ
О о	O o	O o	אָ ,או
П п	P p	P p	פ
Р р	R r	R r	ר
С с	S s	S s	ס
Т т	T t	T t	ת
У у	U u	U u	או
Ф ф	F f	F f	ף
Х х	X x	X x	כ
Ц ц	Ts ts	Ts ts	צ
Ч ч	C c	Ch ch	'צ
Ш ш	Ş ş	Sh sh	ש
Ъ ъ	Ә ә	'	ע
Э э	-	E e	אה
Ю ю	Ju ju	Yu yu	ו'
Я я	Ja ja	Ya ya	ה'
Ғ ғ	Ƣ ƣ	Gh gh	גה
Ӣ ӣ	Ji ji	Yi yi	אײ
Қ қ	Q q	Q q	ק
Ӯ ӯ	Ū ū	U' u'	אה
Ҳ ҳ	H h	H h	ה
Ҷ ҷ	Ç ç	J j	'ג

== Sample text ==
The following text is a Bukharian translation of the first and last verses of Echad Mi Yodea in Hebrew, Cyrillic, Latin, along with an English translation::

Hebrew script
Cyrillic script
Latin script
English translation

יַכּוּמִין כִּי מֵי־דָאנַד?
יַכּוּמִין מַן מֵי־דָאנַם!
יַכּוּמִין כֿוּדָאיִי רַבּוּל עָאלַמִין׃

Якумин кӣ медонад?
Якумин ман медонам!
Якумин Худойи рабул оламин.

Yakumin ki medonad?
Yakumin man medonam!
Yakumin Khudoy-i rab-ul-olamin.

Who knows one?
I know one!
One is our elo’ah in the Heavens and the Earth.

סֶזְדַהוּם כִּי מֵי־דָאנַד?
סֶזְדַהוּם מַן מֵי־דָאנַם!
סֶזְדַהוּם סֶיזְדַה כִֿיצְלַת־הָא.
דוּוָזְדַהוּם דוּוָזְדַה סִיבְֿטָא־הָא.
יָאזְדַהוּם יָאזְדַה סִיתָארַה־הָא.
דַהוּמִין דַה סוּכַֿנָאן.
נוֹהוּמִין נוֹה מָאהִּי זַנָאן.
הַשְׁתוּמִין הַשְׁת רוֹזִי מִילָה.
הַפְֿתוּמִין רוֹזִי הַפְתַה.
שַׁשׁוּמִין שַׁשׁ סִדְרֵי מִשְׁנָה
פַּנְגׄוּמִין פַּנְגׄ סִפְֿרָא תּוֹרָה.
גָ׳אהְרוּמִין גָ׳אהְר מָאדַרָאן.
סֶהוּמִין סֶה פַּדַרָאן.
דוּיוּמִין דוּ לַוְוחִי גַּוְוהַר.
יַכּוּמִין כֿוּדָאיִי רַבּוּל עָאלַמִין׃

Сездаҳум кӣ медонад?
Сездаҳум ман медонам!
Сездаҳум сездаҳ хислатҳо
Дувоздаҳум дувоздаҳ сибтоҳо.
Ёздаҳум ёздаҳ ситораҳо.
Даҳумин даҳ суханон.
Нӯҳумин нӯҳ моҳи занон.
Ҳаштумин ҳашт рӯзи мило.
Ҳафтумин ҳафт рӯзи ҳафта.
Шашумин шаш сидрей Мишно.
Панҷумин панҷ сифро Тӯро.
Чорумин чор модарон.
Сеюмин се падарон.
Дуюмин ду лавхи гавҳар.
Якумин худойи рабул оламин.

Sezdahum ki medonad?
Sezdahum man medonam!
Sezdahum sezdah khislat-ho.
Duvozdahum duvozdah sivto-ho.
Yozdahum yozdah sitora-ho.
Dahumin dah sukhanon.
Nöhumin nöh moh-i zanon.
Hashtumin hasht röz-i milo.
Haftumin haft röz-i hafta.
Shashumin shash sidrey Mishno.
Panjumin panj sifr-o Töro.
Chorumin chor modaron.
Seyumin se padaron.
Duyumin du lavkh-i gavhar.
Yakumin Khudoy-i rab-ul-olamin.

Who knows thirteen?
I know thirteen!
Thirteen are the attributes [of divine mercy],
Twelve are the tribes [of Yisrael],
Eleven are the stars [in Yosef’s dream],
Ten are the commandments,
Nine are the months of pregnancy,
Eight are the days until circumcision,
Seven are the days of the week,
Six are the orders of the Mishnah,
Five are the books of the Torah,
Four are the foremothers,
Three are the forefathers,
Two are the tablets of the covenant,
and One is our elo’ah in the Heavens and the Earth.

== See also ==
- Emirate of Bukhara
- History of the Jews in Afghanistan
- History of the Jews in Tajikistan
- History of the Jews in Uzbekistan
- Judeo-Persian
- Judeo-Tat
