= Gazi language =

Central Iranian language of Iran

Gazi
- اوزون گزی
- Native to: Iran
- Native speakers: ~20,000 (2022)
- Language family: Indo-European: Iranian; Western; Northwestern; Central Plateau languages; Southwest Central Plateau; Esfahān area group; Gazi
- Dialects: Gazi proper; Judeo-Esfahani; Khorzughi; Komshei (Komsheche’i); Varnosfāderāni

Language codes
- ISO 639-3: gzi
- Glottolog: gazi1243
- ELP: Gazi

Gazi is one of the Central Plateau languages varieties of Iran, with approximately 20,000 speakers. The language is spoken in and around Gaz-e Borkhar of Isfahan province, in central Iran.

There are as many as ten dialects, representing slight variations between the various villages of that district. There is also a Jewish and Zoroastrian version of the language amount those two religious communities.
