= Kavir languages =

Iranian language spoken in central Iran

Kavir
- Biabanak
- Native to: Iran
- Native speakers: c. 520
- Language family: Indo-European: Indo-Iranian; Iranian; Western Iranian; Northwestern II; Kavir
- Dialects: Khuri; Farvi; Garmai; Iraji

Language codes
- ISO 639-3: None (mis)
- Glottolog: kavi1234

Kavir, or ambiguously Biyabanaki, is a group of Western Iranian languages spoken in the Kavir valley in central Iran.

The Kavir languages are Farvi (~500 speakers), Garma'i (10 speakers), Khuri, and Iraji (6 speakers).

== Farvi ==
Farvi is a language spoken in the town of Farrokhi. Despite being classified as Northwestern Iranian language, it shares certain similarities with Southwestern languages. Further, it shares some sound changes with Balochi and Kurdish which distinguish them from other Northwestern languages.
