= Judeo-Hamedani–Borujerdi =

Iranian language spoken by Iranian Jews

Judeo-Hamadani Judeo-Borujerdi
- Judeo-Persian
- کۀچلاینه ڤ-نستۊرە
- Native to: Iran
- Native speakers: (8 of Judeo-Hamadani cited 2001)
- Language family: Indo-European: Indo-Iranian; Iranian; Northwestern Iranian; Central Plateau languages; Judeo-Hamadani Judeo-Borujerdi
- Writing system: Hebrew script

Language codes
- ISO 639-3: –
- Glottolog: jude1268
- ELP: Judeo-Hamadani

Judeo-Hamadani and Judeo-Borujerdi constitute a Northwestern Iranian language, originally spoken by the Iranian Jews of Hamadan and Borujerd in western Iran. Hamadanis refer to their language as ebri "Hebrew" or zabān-e qadim "old language". Though not Hebrew, the term ebri is used to distinguish Judeo-Hamadani from Persian.

In 1920, Hamadan had around 13,000 Jewish residents, most can also be found in Israel, New York City, and most predominantly in Los Angeles.

== Judeo-Hamadani Classification ==
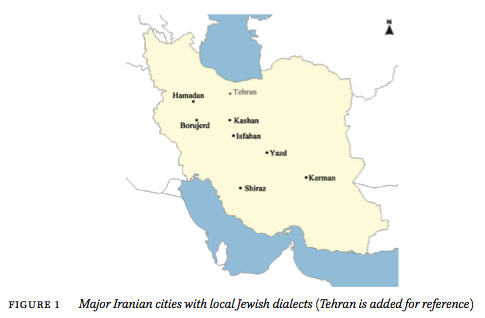
From Journal of Jewish Languages. Picture of the map of Judeo-Median languages.

In western Iran, the district of Hamadan is split between Tuyserkan, Malayer, and Nahavand. This district along with Borujerd, further south in Lorestan Province, forms a geographic cluster that was inhabited by a good portion of Iranian-Jewish communities until recently when those communities emigrated to Tehran, Israel, and North America. Already in 1701, Paul Lucas (cited by De Planhol 2003) wrote that Jews were more numerous in Hamadan than elsewhere in Persia. According to Encyclopedia Iranica, the Jewish community had dwindled from around 13,000 souls in 1920 to less than 1,000 by 1969. It is hard to find people who still speak the Judeo-Hamadani language since only people born before the mid-1940s were raised speaking the dialect. Given the large diaspora population, few people today speak the Judeo-Hamadani language; it is unknown whether native speakers under the age of 50 exist. The lack of preservation of Judeo-Hamadani is primarily due to cultural, political, and economic marginalization of the Jewish community. Unlike Judeo-Hamadani, Persian carried prestige as the majority language, and by adopting it, Jews were afforded greater educational and employment opportunities, as well as social status. Persian's influence was not only cultural, but linguistic.

As Habib Borjian points out, Hamadan was once the capital of Media, implying that a form of Northwestern Iranian Median must have been spoken here before Southwestern Iranian Persian became the dominant language of the entire Iranian Plateau (Habib Borjian, 121). Habib Borjian explains that these moribund dialects show closest resemblance to the dialects spoken in the areas of Qazvin and Zanjan, both north of Hamadan, and further northwest in Azerbaijan (Habib Borjian, 121). This suggests that migration from central Iran led to Jewish dialects in Hamadan.

== Grammar ==
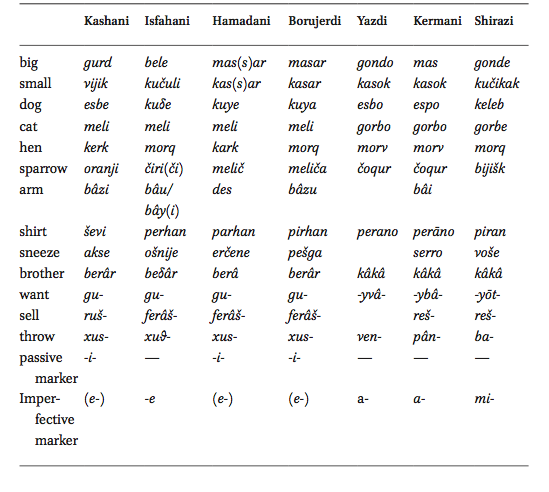
Language comparison taken from The Journal of Jewish Languages

If we look at the chart above, we can see how Judeo-Hamadani is compared to some of the other Judeo-Median Languages. Judeo-Hamadani appears most similar to Kashani in terms of morphosyntax, evidenced by shared passive and imperfect markers. Judeo-Hamadani also shares many lexical items with Judeo-Isfahani, including "throw", "want", "cat", and "dog". This overlap, though notable and suggests similar origins or contact, is not significant enough for these languages to be mutually intelligible. In fact, due to language contact, dialectal shift, and diaspora, none of the Judeo-Median languages are mutually intelligible. According to Habib Borjian, "Tentative studies reveal that Tuyserkani agrees with Hamadani in all major grammatical points and lexical items (Stilo 2003), and that the dialects of Borujerd and Nehavand15 are close (Yarshater 1989)".

== Phonology ==
Oral history of Judeo-Hamedani-Borujerdi.

The consonant inventory of Judeo-Hamadani is: /p, b, t, d, č, ǰ, ž, k, g, q~γ, f, v, s, z, š, x, h, m, n, r, l, y/. There may also be a pharyngeal /ħ/ especially in words borrowed from Hebrew and Arabic.

Its vowel inventory is /i, e, ə, a, u, ō, o, ā/. Stilo states that ə is probably a variant of e.

Judeo-Hamadani also has diphthongs, including āā, ao, uā, ayi, āy, ey, iye, av, and āv. The suprasegmentals of the language, including rhythm, tone, intonation, and stress, are influenced by the Persian Hamadani dialect.

== Lexicon ==
Judeo-Hamadani contains many loanwords from Hebrew, standard Persian, and Hamadani Persian. Loanwords provide insight into language contact and historical cultural overlap. For example, the term venadig "window glass" appears in Judeo-Hamadani, spelled venedig in Hamadani, identical to the German Venedig "Venice." The Hamadani word likely originally referred to glass imported from Venice and used in windows. Like venedig, other loanwords were likely transferred to Judeo-Hamadani from Hamadani proper, or through direct contact with speakers of other languages.

== Morphology ==
=== Nouns ===
Judeo-Hamadani's morphology is similar to Persian's. Below is a list of nominal morphological characteristics of Judeo-Hamadani:

- substantives have no distinction of grammatical gender;
- numbers have no distinction between the direct and oblique case;
- postpositional rā/ro mark definite direct objects;
- the plural suffix -(h)ā marks substantives that are both inanimate or animate;
- indefinite markers commonly occur together, and appear as ye(y) "one" and an unstressed -i (Judeo-Esfahani also possesses this characteristic); and,
- modifiers follow the noun.

=== Pronouns ===
Personal pronouns in Judeo-Hamadani are identical to those in Persian save for two differences: Judeo-Hamadani has the -ā- vowel in mān "I," and uses the form hāmā "we" as opposed to the Persian mā. Clitics in Judeo-Hamadani are mobile, and there is a general tendency for movement forward, to the left. They can also appear inside the verb when it is possible. Like other Iranian languages, Judeo-Hamadani only has one pronominal clitic form for all cases: the oblique.

== Verbs ==
=== Preverbs ===
Judeo-Hamadani commonly uses preverbs he-, vā and vor-. Often, preverbs cause no semantic change in the verb root. However, in cases like vā-ker-ān "I open," there is a meaning change of "ker". In general, preverbs precede any negative particle, clitics, and durative particle, and always occur in the initial position.

he-ne=m-e-gefte PV-NEG=1S.OBL-DUR-take.PP "I have not bought"

=== Tenses ===
Judeo-Hamadani has eight tenses, present, imperfect, subjunctive, imperative, preterit, present perfect, past perfect, and progressive.

Judeo-Hamadani Verb Formation
Tense	Formation	Example
present	by suffixed and unstressed e- (durative marker)	e-ker-u "makes, does"
imperfect	by suffixed and unstressed e- (durative marker)	e-ker-u "makes, does"
subjunctive	prefix be-	be-š-im "we would go"
imperative	prefix be-	be-gir "take it!"
preterit	prefix be-	be=m-vād "I told"
present perfect	prefix be-	be=m-e-šnofte "I have heard")
past perfect	prefix be-	be=m-xorte bo "I had eaten"
progressive	on the basis of the colloquial Persian construction with the modal verb dāštan	mān dār-ān bar-gard-ān az kenisā "I am returning from synagogue"

== Related News Articles ==
- Ancient Judeo-Persian Language Kept Alive
