= Western Iranian languages =

Branch of the Iranian languages

Western Iranian
- Western Iranic
- Geographic distribution: Southwest Asia, Central Asia, Caucasus, and western South Asia
- Linguistic classification: Indo-European: Indo-Iranian; Iranian; Western Iranian
- Subdivisions: Adharic; Balochic; Caspian; Komisenian; Semnani; Central Iranian-Kermanic; Laki-Kurdish; Bashkardi; Farsic-Caucasian Tatic; Fars dialects; Larestani; Luric; Kumzari; Extinct languages; Median †; Old Persian †; Parthian †; Old Azeri †

Language codes
- Glottolog: nort3177 Northwestern Iranian sout3157 Southwestern Iranian

Distribution of the Iranian languages in and around the Iranian plateau.

The Western Iranian languages or Western Iranic languages are a branch of the Iranian languages, attested from the time of Old Persian (6th century BC) and Median. The languages belonging to this branch are widely spoken across a vast geographical area stretching to Anatolia in the west, the Caucasus in the north, southern Iran in the south and Tajikistan in the east. The most widely spoken Western Iranian language is Persian, which is a pluricentric language.

== History ==
From a diachronic perspective, the Iranian languages are stratified into three distinct historical stages: Old Iranian, Middle Iranian, and New Iranian. The diachronic classification of the Western Iranian languages also follows this tripartite developmental trajectory. Old Persian and Median constitute the earliest documented Western Iranian languages from the Old Iranian era. While a substantial corpus of Old Persian has been preserved, the textual evidence for Median is highly restricted, limited to a small number of lexical items attested in Old Persian inscriptions. The Persian language is the only Western Iranian language attested across all three stages of Iranian languages: Old, Middle, and New Iranian and is the only Iranian language for which close philological relationships between all of its three stages are established and so that Old, Middle, and New Persian represent one and the same language of Persian.

=== Old Iranian period ===
The Old Iranian period languages consisted of the following languages:

- Northwest: Median†
- Southwest: Old Persian†

Old Persian appears primarily in the inscriptions, clay tablets and seals of the Achaemenid era (c. 600 BCE to 300 BCE). Examples of Old Persian have been found in what is now Iran, Armenia, Bahrain, Iraq, Turkey and Egypt, with the most important attestation by far being the contents of the Behistun Inscription (dated to 522 BCE). Median, on the other hand, is attested only by numerous loanwords in Old Persian. Nothing is known of its grammar, structurally, however, its phonological isoglosses align more closely with Avestan than with Old Persian. It is believed that during the brief period of Median rule, Median functioned, at least to some degree, as an official language within western Iran.

=== Middle Iranian period ===
The Middle Iranian period languages consisted of the following languages:

- Middle West Iranian
  - Northwest: Parthian†
  - Southwest: Middle Persian†

Parthian was the official language of the Parthian state and the local language east of the Caspian Sea. The language was written in a distinct script derived from the Imperial Aramaic chancellery script of the Achaemenids, and later developed into the Pahlavi writing system. A direct successor to Old Persian, Middle Persian was the dominant language in the Sasanian Empire.

=== Modern period (Neo-Iranian) ===
There is no consensus on the exact linguistic classification of the Iranian languages, and the traditional grouping between Northwestern and Southwestern Iranian languages seems to become more ambiguous upon closer inspection of individual dialects and languages. This indicates that these language groups are not genetic entities. Primarily focused on phonology, Ludwig Paul and Gernot Windfuhr propose that the Western Iranian languages exist on "a scale of ‘Northwesternness’ or ‘Southwesternness’, on which each language is ‘more or less’ NW or SW.", though this does not take into account linguistic convergence in grammar and other linguistic aspects.

== Phonology ==
Phonologically, overall, from Parthian, Gurani, Tati, Zaza and Talysh downward to Balochi, Kurdish and Persian, the Western Iranian languages are successively less archaic. Phonologically, Gurani, Tati, Zaza and Talysh occupy the westernmost fringe of the Western Iranian language continuum, whereas Persian and Kurdish are positioned at the eastern extreme, with Kurdish demonstrating the closest phonetic affinity and highest degree of phonological proximity to Persian, a southwestern Iranian language. Kurdish exhibits a transitional character aligned with Persian within the Western Iranian linguistic continuum:

| PIE | Parthian | Gurani | Tati | Zaza | Talysh | Semnani | Caspian | Central dia. | Balochi | Kurdish | Persian |
|---|---|---|---|---|---|---|---|---|---|---|---|
| *ḱ/ĝ | s/z | s/z | s/z | s/z | s/z | s/z | s/z | s/z | s/z | s/z | h/d |
| *k(^{u})^{pal} | -ž- | -ž- | -ž- | -ĵ- | -ž | -ĵ,ž- | -ĵ- | -ĵ-,ž,z | -ĵ- | -ž- | -z- |
| *g^{u}(h)^{pal} | ž | ž | ž (y-) | ĵ | ž | ĵ,ž | ĵ | ĵ,ž,z | ĵ | ž | z |
| *kw^{29} | ? | sip | isb | esb | asb | esp | s | esb | ? | s | s |
| *tr/*tl | hr | (ya)r | (h)r | (hi)r | (h)*r | (h)r | r | r | s | s | s |
| *d(h)w | b | b | b | b | b | b | b | b | d | d | d |
| *rd/*rz | r/rz | l, rz | r/rz | r/rz | rz | l/l(rz) | l/l | l/l(rz) | l/l | l/l | l/l |
| *sw | wx | w | h | w | h | x(u) | x(u) | x(u),f | v | x(w) | x(u) |
| *tw | f | u | u | w | h | h | h | h(u) | h | h | h |
| *y- | y- | y- | y- | ĵ- | ĵ- | ĵ- | ĵ- | ĵ- (y-) | ĵ- | ĵ- | ĵ- |

The Northwestern and Southwestern phonological differences of the Western Iranian languages are also reflected in the variations extending to their numeral systems and the phonology of cardinal numbers. The phonetic realization of the numeral three constitutes a critical criterion in taxonomically classifying Western Iranian languages within these Northwestern and Southwestern branches. In certain Western Iranian languages, the number of three is cognate with the Northwestern Iranian Parthian form hrē; conversely, in other Western Iranian languages, it exhibits cognatic alignment with the Southwestern Iranian Old Persian form se < *çaiiah. Among all Western Iranian languages, only in Zaza, Semnani (and its dialects such as Sorkhei, Lasgerdi, Biyabunaki) and Tati (and its dialects such as Harzandi, Kilit) the number three is cognate with Northwestern Iranian Parthian hry/hrē. Old Iranian /*θr/ further became /*hr/, in initial position acquired a supporting vowel here. On the other hand, languages such as Persian, Kurdish, Balochi, Luri and Laki utilize sa and its derivatives for three, which originate from Old Persian se < *çaiiah. Another phonological divergence between the Northwestern and Southwestern branches manifests in the v versus b and s versus h consonant shifts. While the Northwestern Iranian languages have preserved the consonants v and s, these sounds have shifted to b and h, respectively, within the Southwestern Iranian branch, e.g. vist and das in Zaza, Semnani, Tati, Parthian vs. bist and dah in Persian and Kurdish. As a rare linguistic feature, in Zaza, Semnani and Tati the number one, denoting the indefinite article, takes both masculine and feminine forms. In Avestan, which is an extinct Old Iranian language, numbers took gender specific forms. The diachronic distribution of Western Iranian cardinal systems and their phonological shifts are as follows:

| | one | two | three | four | five | six | seven | eight | nine | ten | twenty | thirty | forty |
|---|---|---|---|---|---|---|---|---|---|---|---|---|---|
| Avestan | aēva/aēvā (masc/fem) | dva | θrī | čaθwar | panca | hšvaš | hapta | ašta | nava | dasa | vīsati | hrīsat | čahwarsat |
| Parthian | ēw | dō | hrē | čafār | panǰ | šwah | haft | hašt | nah | das | wist | hrīst | čāfarast |
| Zaza | žew/žû (masc/fem) | di | hīrē | čahār | panǰ | šaš | haut | hašt | naw | das | vist | hīris | čāwras |
| Tati | iv/iva (masc/fem) | de | here | čö,čuār | panǰ | šoš | hoft | hašt | növ | da | vist | si | čel |
| Semnani | i/iya (masc/fem) | du | hera | čār | panǰ | šaš | haft | hašt | na | das | vist | si | čel |
| Sorkhei | i | do | heré | čār | panǰ | šaš | haft | hašt | na | das | vist | si | čel |
| Lasgerdi | i | do | heyré | čār | panǰ | šaš | haft | hašt | na | das | vist | si | čel |
| Biyabunaki | i | dū | häirä | čāhār | pahānǰ | šāš | hāft | hāšt | nā | dās | vist | si | čel |
| Harzandi | i | de | heri | ču | pinǰ | šaš | hoft | hašt | nov | da | vist | si | čel |
| Kilit | ivi | dèv | he | čoy | pinǰ | šaš | haft | hašt | nav | dah | vist | si | čel |
| Talysh | i, yak | di | he, se | čo | penǰ | šaš | haft | hašt | nav | da | vist | si | čil |
| Gurani | yak | du'e | y'are | čuār | panǰ | šiš | hawt | hašt | no | da | wis | si | čil |
| Gilaki | yak | do | se | čār | panǰ | šaš | haft | hašt | ne | da | bist | si | čil |
| Mazanderani | yak | do | se | čār | panǰ | šaš | haft | hašt | ne | da | bist | si | čil |
| Balochi | yak | do | se | čār | panǰ | šaš | hapt | hašt | noh | dah | bist | si | čil |
| Luri | yak | do | se | čār | panǰ | šaš | haft | hašt | noh | dah | bist | si | čel |
| Kurdish | yak | du | se | čār | penǰ | šaš | haft | hašt | nah | dah | bist | si | čil |
| Larestani | yak | do | se | čā:r, čār | panǰ | šeš | aft | ašt | no: | da: | biss | si: | če:l, čel |
| Persian | yak | do | se | čahār | panǰ | šaš | haft | hašt | noh | dah | bist | si | čehel |
| Tajik | yak | du | se | čor | panǰ | šaš | haft | hašt | nuh | dah | bist | si | čil |

== Grammar ==
=== Gender system ===
While certain Northwestern Iranian languages have retained the grammatical gender inherited from the Old Iranian period, this feature has been lost in others. Grammatical gender has been extensively preserved in Zaza, Semnani, Sangsari and various Tati dialects. Additionally, numerous Central Iranian languages and dialects, such Delījāni, Jowšaqāni, Āmoraʾi, Abyānaʾi, Abūzaydābādi, have prominently preserved grammatical gender. On the other hand, grammatical gender has been lost in many dialects of Gurani, except for the more archaic Avromani dialect, which has preserved this feature. In Kurdish, the grammatical gender is only preserved in Northern Kurdish and only in singular nouns and not in plural, nominative and not in verbs and not in copula. Talysh, Balochi, the Caspian languages, Gilaki, Mazanderani, Central Kurdish and Southern Kurdish, many Gurani dialects, Persian (Old Persian had grammatical gender), Luri and Laki have lost grammatical gender altogether.

Zaza, Tati, Semnani and numerous Central Iranian languages largely maintain the grammatical gender forms of Old Iranian, excluding the neuter, uniquely among Western Iranian languages. Zaza, Semnani and various Tati and central dialects are distinguished within Western Iranian by marking grammatical gender on verbs, representing a highly idiosyncratic typological feature. These languages preserve the morphological expressions of grammatical gender across direct and oblique cases, verbs, the third person singular, the numeral "one", and the copula:

| | masc dir sg | masc obl sg | fem dir sg | fem obl sg | masc/fem dir/obl pl | cop masc/fem |
|---|---|---|---|---|---|---|
| Zaza | -Ø | + i | + e | + e | + i / + un | -o/-ā |
| Tati | -Ø | + e | + a | + e | + e / + on | -e/-ā |
| Semnani | -Ø | + i | + ā | + en | + i / + un | -a/-e |

| | masc | fem |
|---|---|---|
| Zaza | subjmasc-Ø predmasc copula-o | subjfem-e predfem copula-ā |
| Tati | subjmasc-Ø predmasc copula-e | subjfem-a predfem copula-ā |
| Semnani | subjmasc-Ø predmasc copula-a | subjfem-ā predfem copula-e |
| Semnani (Note: Momenabadi) | subjmasc-Ø predmasc copula-a | subjfem-Ø predfem copula-ā |
| Sangsari | subjmasc-Ø predmasc copula-a | subjfem-Ø predfem copula-ö |

=== Kinship markers ===
Talysh, Tati, Zaza, Sangsari and Semnani exhibit an identical oblique case marker (-r) for kinship terms, a feature that distinguishes these languages from all other Western Iranian languages. In Zaza and some Tati dialects, the oblique case of relationship terms /-r/ also has spread from relationship terms to other terms:

| | father dir | father obl |
|---|---|---|
| Zaza | pī | pēr |
| Talysh | pə | pār |
| Tati | pia | piar |
| Semnani | pia | piär |

| | mother dir | mother obl |
|---|---|---|
| Zaza | mā | mār |
| Talysh | mā | moār |
| Tati | mâ | mâr |
| Semnani | me | mār |

=== Case and personal enclitics ===
A distinct aspect of the Iranian languages is the existence of a group of personal enclitics inherited from Old Iranian. These function as markers of persons in all the oblique cases, including the possessive, indirect object, direct object, and ergative agent, as well as the general oblique case. The loss, or absence, of these enclitics is therefore of great historical and typological importance, and can only be best explained by assuming a strong and enduring "substrate" typology. The languages that have lost these enclitics are Tati (Harzandi), Talyshi, Zaza, Gilaki, Mazanderani, Semnani, Sangsari and Kurmanji.

=== Modal prefixes ===
Morphologically, the derivation of present-stem bases from the Old Iranian present participle /*-ant/ constitutes a primary diagnostic feature distinguishing Zaza, Tati, Talysh, Gilaki, Semnani, Mazandarani and other Caspian languages from the Southwestern Iranian structural patterns of Persian and Kurdish. The present tense structure and conjugation of Kurdish parallel those of Persian, a Southwestern Iranian language.

| English | Zaza | Gilaki | Mazanderani | Semnani (Note: Aftari) | Sangsari | Tati (Note: Harzandi) | Talysh | Gurani | Kurdish | Persian |
|---|---|---|---|---|---|---|---|---|---|---|
| 3s "to do" | ke-n-o | ku-n-e | kar-n-e | ke-nn-e | ke-nd-e | ko-nd-e | kerd-ed-e | mi-kar-u | di-k-e | mi-kon-ad |
| 3s "to go" | šo-n-o | šu-n-e | šo-n-e | šo-nn-e | šu-nd-e | še-nd-e | še-d-e | mi-l-u | di-č-e | mi-rav-ad |

Among the Northwestern Iranian languages and dialects that utilize a modal prefix include the Central dialects (e(t)-), some Semnani dialects (ma-), Southern Tati (me-) Gorani (mi-), Laki, Kurmanji, Sorani (di-, de-, et-, ed-) and the Vafsi dialect of Talysh. Among the Southwestern Iranian languages include Persian (mi-). The modal prefix marks the imperfective aspect in verbs. It is suggested that the Persian modal prefix stems from Old Iranian *hama-aiwa ("at the same time"), and that the modal prefix among the Central dialects (e(t)-) stems from *aiwa-da ("always"), though it is not clear if this is the same etymon for the Kurdish languages. The form *ham- alone is found in a Khorasani Persian dialect of Shahrud hall-ger-om ("I am taking"), and is also reflected in Sogdian and the Khwarezmian language.

In some Western Iranian languages, the imperfect past tense is contrasted with the perfective past tense by the prefix ba-. However, in Caspian languages, though not Semnani, the imperfect past tense form is formed by subtracting ba-. In some dialects of Tati, such as Harzandi, the original present tense has become a subjunctive form, and now utilizes Turkic-type locative progressive constructions based on the infinitive instead for the general present tense. A distinct archaism from Old Iranian seems to have been preserved in Talysh, Tati and Gorani, where the imperfect past tense is formed on the present tense stem, which is also documented in the Eastern Iranian Yaghnobi language.

=== Syntax ===
Western Iranian languages possess an ezafe construction that serves to connect a noun with its modifiers, adjectives, or possessives. The ezāfe is also attested in several Turkic and Indo-Aryan languages, including Azerbaijani, Ottoman Turkish, Chagatai, Hindustani (Hindi-Urdu), Punjabi, Sindhi, Bengali and Kashmiri. It often approximately corresponds in usage to the English preposition of. Persian, Kurdish, Luri, Laki, Gurani and the Central Iranian languages utilize an ezafe system which attaches to the head noun to connect it with dependents such as possessors, adjectives, and noun modifiers. Zaza features a distinctive ezafe system that distinguishes it from all other Iranian languages by employing a "double ezafe" structure. The Caspian languages and Balochi also use a distinct ezafe system known as "reverse ezafe" which sets it apart from the standard ezafe.

== Languages ==
Glottolog proposes the following linguistic classification and subgrouping of the Western Iranian languages:

- Western Iranian
  - Northwestern Iranian
    - Adharic
      - Adhari (Old Azeri)†
      - Zaza
        - Southern Zaza (Dimli) (Dumbuli, Hazzu, Kori, Motki, Sivereki)
        - Northern Zaza (Kirmanjki) (Tunceli, Varto)
      - Tatic (Tati-Talysh)
        - Alamuti
        - Central Tatic (Khalkhali (Kajali, Karanic [Diz, Gandomabi, Hezarrudi Karan (Khoresh-e Rostam) Karnaq, Kelasi, Lerd, Nowkiani], Shahrudi -Southern Talysh ([Shali-Kolur, Shandermani, Southern Talysh, Massali Masulei]), Khoini, Maraghei [Dikini], North-Central Talysh (Central Talysh [Asalemi, Hashtpari], Northern Talysh [Astara, Lenkoran, Lerik], Taromic [Kabate, Kalasi, Upper Taromi],
        - Northern Tatic: Harzandi-Kilit (Harzandi, Kilit†), Karingani-Kalasuri-Khoynarudi (Karingani, Kalasuri-Khoynarudi),
        - Southern Tatic: Alviri-Vidari (Alviri, Vidari), Vafsic (Ashtiani [Amorei, Kahaki, Nuclear Ashtiani, Tafresh], Vafsi), Ramand-Karaj: Eshtehardi, Razajerdi, Takestani (Khalkhal, Kharaqani, Ramandi, Tarom, Zanjan))
      - Gurani
        - Gurani
        - Shabaki-Bajelani (Bajelani, Chabak, Sarli)
    - Balochic
      - Eastern Balochi (Bugti, Kasrani, Leghari, Marri, Mazari, Upper Sindhi Balochi)
      - Southern-Western Balochi
        - Southern-Western Balochi-Koroshi
          - Koroshi (Coastal Koroshi, Inland Koroshi)
          - Southern Balochi (Coastal Balochi [Kechi, Barahuwi, Bashgaadi, Huuti Karachi Balochi Makrani], Kechi)
        - Western Balochi
          - Lashari (Bampuri, Iranshahr)
          - Rakhshani (Kalati Balochi, Panjguri, Sarhaddi Balochi [Afghanistan Balochi, Sistani Balochi, Turkmenistan Balochi])
    - Caspian
      - Gorgani†
      - Gilaki-Rudbari
        - Gilaki
          - Western Gilaki (Anzali, Fumani Rashti)
          - Eastern Gilaki (Lahijani, Langerudi, Machiani)
          - Galeshi
        - Rudbari
      - Mazandarani-Shahmirzadi
        - Mazandarani (Central Caspian, Gachsari, Galeshi of Mazanderan, Nuclear Mazanderani, Velatru)
        - Shahmirzadi
    - Komisenian
      - Lasgerdi
      - Sangisari
      - Sorkhei-Aftari
        - Sorkhei
        - Aftari
    - Semnani-Biyabuneki
      - Semnani
      - Biyabuneki
    - Central Iran-Kermanic
      - Kavir (Farvi, Garme'i, Khuri, Mihrijan)
      - Nuclear Central-Kermanic
        - Gazic (Judeo-Esfahani, Ardestani, Gazi, Jarquya'i, Kafrudi, Kuhpa'i, Nohuji, Rudashti, Sedehi, Zefra'i)
        - Judeo-Hamedani-Borujerdi (Judeo-Hamedani, Judeo-Borujerdi)
        - Kashanic
          - Natanzic (Abyane'i, Badi (Median), Badrudi, Bidhandi, Farizandi, Hanjani, Natanzi, Yarandi)
          - Soic (Abuzaydabadi, Arani-Bidgoli, Delijani, Jowshaqani, Judeo-Kashani, Soi)
        - Khunsaric (Judeo-Khomeini, Judeo-Khunsari, Khunsari, Mahallati, Vaneshani)
        - Judeo-Kermani-Nayini
          - Nayinic (Abchuya'i, Anarak, Keyjani, Nayini, Tudeshki)
          - Zoroastrian Yazdi (Gabri [Iranian], Judeo-Yazdi-Kermani, Parsi [Zoroastrian], Zoroastrian Dari)
      - Sivandi
    - Laki-Kurdish
      - Kurdish
        - Northern Kurdish (Northern Kurmanji, Southeastern Kurmanji, Southern Kurmanji, Western Kurmanji)
        - Central Kurdish (Mukri, Sine'i, Sorani)
        - Southern Kurdish (Ilami, Lakic Southern Kurdish, Peripheral Kermanshahic, Kordali)
      - Laki
  - Southwestern Iranian
    - Bashkardi
      - Northern Bashaka (Garmsiri, North Bashkardi)
      - Southern Bashaka (Garahven, Gwafr, Parmont, Pirou, Shahbavek)
    - Fars dialects (Ardakani, Buringuni, Davani, Judeo-Shirazi, Kalati, Kondazi, Masarmi, Papuni, Somghuni, Xullari, Heshnizi, Gavbandi, Dashtini, Kangani, Jami, Bardesuni (Bardestani)
    - Farsic-Caucasian Tat
      - Caucasian
        - Judeo-Tat (Central Judeo-Tat, Northern Judeo-Tat, Southern Judeo-Tat)
        - Muslim Tat (Absheron, Mədrəsə, Northern Muslim Tat, Şirvan Muslim Tat, Xızı)
      - Farsic
        - Eastern Farsi (Aimaq, Dari, Dehwari, Hazaragi, Pahlavani)
        - Tajikic
          - Bukharic
          - Tajik (Badakhshan, Darwazi, Derbent, Goron, Hissar, Tajik, Karatag, Kuljub, Lyuli, Matchin, Vaxio-Bolo)
      - Judeo-Persian
      - Persian (Western Farsi)
        - Central Persian (Esfahani, Kermani Persian)
        - Eastern Persian (Khorasan Persian, Sistani Persian)
        - Northern Persian (Tehrani, Araki (Iran), Gorgani Persian, Karbalai, Kermanshahi Persian, Ketabi (Literary), Mahalati Malayeri, Perso-Tabaric [Damavandi, Lower Jajrudi, Shemiran, Taleqan-Karaj], Qazvini Persian, Qomi Persian, Savei)
        - Southern Persian (Bandari [Bandar Abbasi, Hajiab, Khamiri, Lengei, Qeshmi], Bushehri [Bahraini, Dashtestani, Dashti, Jami, Nuclear Bushehri, Tangestani], Fars Persian [Abadei, Basseri, Jahromi, Kazeruni, Old Shirazi, Shirazi], Khuzestani [Abadani, Ahvazi, Behbahani, Ramhormozi])
    - Kumzari
    - Laric (Larestani)
      - Bastaki, Bixai, Evazi, Gerashi, Lari, Xonji
    - Luric-Dezfulic
      - Dezfuli-Shushtari
        - Dezfuli
        - Shushtari
      - Luric
        - Bakhtiari-Southern Luri
          - Bakhtiari (Charlang, Chelgerd, Haft-Lang, Kuhrang)
          - Southern Luri (Boyerahmadi, Kohgiluyeh, Mamasani, Shuli, Yasuji)
        - Northern Luri (Andimeshki, Bala-Gariva'i, Borujerdi, Cagani, Khorramabadi, Mahali (Iran), Nahavandi)

=== Unclassified languages ===
There is also a recently described, and as yet unclassified, Batu'i language that is presumably Western Iranian. Extinct Deilami is sometimes classified in the Caspian branch. An Iranian Khalaj language has been claimed, but does not exist; the Khalaj speak a Turkic language.

=== Notes ===
Many of the languages and dialects spoken in Markazi and Isfahan provinces are giving way to Persian in the younger generations. It is to note that the Caspian languages (incl. Adharic), the central dialects, Zaza and Gorani languages are likely descended from a later form of Median with varying amounts of Parthian substrata, whereas the Semnani languages were likely descended from Parthian.

== See also ==
- Eastern Iranian languages

== Bibliography ==
- Lazard, G. (1975). "The Rise of the New Persian Language". In Frye, Richard N. (ed.). The Cambridge History of Iran: From the Arab Invasion to the Saljuqs. Vol. 4. Cambridge: Cambridge University Press. pp. 595–633. ISBN 0-521-20093-8.
- Skjærvø, Prods Oktor (2018) [2006]. "Iran vi. Iranian languages and scripts (2) Documentation". In Yarshater, Ehsan (ed.). Encyclopædia Iranica (Online ed.). Encyclopædia Iranica Foundation.
- Pierre Lecoq. 1989. "Les dialectes caspiens et les dialectes du nord-ouest de l'Iran," Compendium Linguarum Iranicarum, ed. Rüdiger Schmitt. Wiesbaden: L. Reichert Verlag, 1989; p. 99.
- Daryaee, Touraj (2008). Sasanian Persia: The Rise and Fall of an Empire. I.B. Tauris. ISBN 9781850438984.
- Boyce, Mary (1983). "Parthian Writings and Literature". In Yarshater, Ehsan (ed.). The Cambridge History of Iran: The Seleucid, Parthian and Sasanian Periods. Vol. 3(2). Cambridge: Cambridge University Press. pp. 1151–1165. ISBN 0-521-24693-8.
- Yarshater, Ehsan (1960). "The Tāti Dialect of Kajal". Bulletin of the School of Oriental and African Studies. 23 (2): 275–286. doi:10.1017/S0041977X00149948.
- Paul, Ludwig (1998). "The Position of Zazaki Among West Iranian languages" (PDF). In Sims-Williams, Nicholas (ed.). Proceedings of the Third European Conference of Iranian Studies held in Cambridge, 11th to 15th September 1995. Vol. I: Old and Middle Iranian Studies. Wiesbaden: Ludwig Reichert. pp. 163–177.
- Frye, Richard Nelson (1984). Handbuch der Altertumswissenschaft: Alter Orient-Griechische Geschichte-Römische Geschichte. Band III,7: The History of Ancient Iran. C.H.Beck. ISBN 978-3406093975.
- Kuhrt, A. (2013). The Persian Empire: A Corpus of Sources from the Achaemenid Period. Routledge. ISBN 978-1136016943.
- Schmitt, Rüdiger (2000). The Old Persian Inscriptions of Naqsh-i Rustam and Persepolis. Corpus Inscriptionum Iranicarum by School of Oriental and African Studies. ISBN 978-0728603141.
- Skjærvø, Prods Oktor (2002). An Introduction to Old Persian (PDF) (Revised and expanded 2nd ed.). Harvard.
- Windfuhr, Gernot (2009). The Iranian Languages. New York: Routledge. ISBN 978-0-7007-1 131-4.
- Пахалина, Т. Н. (1999). Языки мира: Иранские языки. II (in Russian). Москваk: ОССИЙСКАЯ АКАДЕМИЯ НАУК.
- Borjian, Habib (2026), "How Many Languages Are spoken in Semnan Area?: Typology and Origins of Komisenian Languages", in Korangy, Alireza; Khoshsirat, Zia (eds.), Caspian Languages and Linguistics: Eight Essays, Singapore: Springer Singapore, pp. 15–38
- Hassanzadeh-Nodehi, Ramin (2025). Towards a grammar of the Semnāni language (PDF) (PhD thesis). Rome: Sapienza – Università di Roma.
