= Judeo-Persian =

Persian dialects spoken by Jews in Iran

- Native to: Israel; Iran; Afghanistan; Uzbekistan; Tajikistan; Azerbaijan; Russia; Dagestan
- Native speakers: 60,000 in Israel (2018)
- Language family: Indo-European: Indo-Iranian; Iranian; Western; Southwestern; Persian; Judeo-Persian
- Writing system: Hebrew

Language codes
- ISO 639-2: jpr
- ISO 639-3: jpr
- Glottolog: jude1257

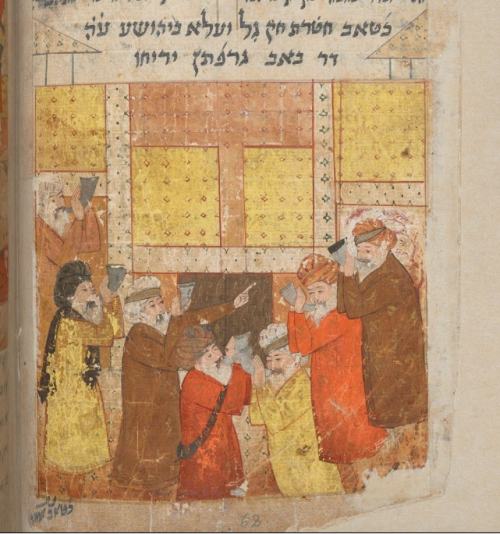
Seven Priests sounding horns at Wall of Jericho. From an illustrated manuscript of Emrani's Fath-nameh.

Judeo-Persian refers to both a group of Jewish dialects spoken by Jews and Judeo-Persian texts which is written in the Hebrew alphabet. As a collective term, Judeo-Persian refers to a number of Judeo-Iranian languages spoken by Jewish communities throughout the formerly extensive Persian Empire, including Iranian Jews, Mountain Jews, Afghan Jews, and Bukharan Jews.

The speakers refer to their language as Fārsi and some reporting even Pārsi. Some non-Jews refer to it as "dzhidi" (also written as "zidi", "judi" or "jidi"), which means "Jewish" in a derogatory sense.

Over time, most speakers of Judeo-Persian also evolved to use an Arabic, Latin or Cyrillic alphabet in the 19th-20th centuries.

== Literature ==
There is an extensive Judeo-Persian poetic religious literature, closely modeled on classical Persian poetry. The most famous poet was Mowlānā Shāhin-i Shirāzi (14th century CE), who composed epic versifications of parts of the Bible, such as the Musā-nāmah (an epic poem recounting the story of Moses); later poets composed lyric poetry in style of Persian mysticism. Much of this literature was collected around the beginning of the twentieth century by the ּּBukharan rabbi Shimon Hakham, who founded a printing press in Israel.

=== Earliest Judeo-Persian writings ===
The earliest evidence of Judeo-Persian writing dates back to the 8th century CE. These documents written in Hebrew script document the existence of Jewish communities writing in Judeo-Persian across historical Persia. Archaeologists working in the 20th century discovered Judeo-Persian writings in locations as far-spread as southern India, Xinjiang Province, Cairo, and present-day Iran and Afghanistan. They include court documents, trade documents, headstones, stone inscriptions, and works on religious matters.

=== Biblical epics ===
==== Mowlānā Shāhin-i Shirāzi ====
The most famous Judeo-Persian poet is the 14th century Shahin-i Shirazi who composed two versified Biblical epics: the first based on the Pentateuch and the second centered on the Book of Esther and the Book of Ezra. In his writing, Shahin uses a language typical of his era’s Classical Persian and does not employ the same level of Hebrew words as other Judeo-Persian writers.

===== Pentateuchal epic =====
Shahin's Pentateuchal epic cycle consists of 10,000 metered couplet (distich) versification of the Books of Exodus, Leviticus, Numbers, and Deuteronomy written in 1327, and a 8,700 couplet length versification of Genesis composed in 1358. He focuses on narratives from the Pentateuch that are also prominent in Islamic literature such as the fall of Satan, Joseph (Yusuf) and Zulaykha, and Jacob’s mourning of the lost Joseph. Shahin fashions his biblical epics off of Ferdowsi’s Shahnameh, the most renowned Persian epic in Persian mythology. This includes styling Moses after heroes from Persian epic heroes, contributing to a glorification of Moses prevalent in Judeo-Persian literature. Shahin omits certain elements of the Pentateuch such as the legal sections. In a short adaptation of the Book of Job appended to his versification of Genesis, Shahin leaves out the speeches from Job’s friends and God’s response while including the less-central insults from Job’s wife.

===== Ardashir-nameh =====
Shahin’s Ardashir-namah consists of 9,000 metered couplets that adapt narratives from the Books of Esther, Nehemiah, and Ezra. He also includes non-biblical storylines that parallel the Shahnameh and Nizami’s Khamsa. It recounts the biblical narrative of Ardashir (Xerxes) and Esther; and a love story between Ardashir and a Chinese princess. The Ezra-nameh is shorter and often grouped with the Ardashir-nameh.

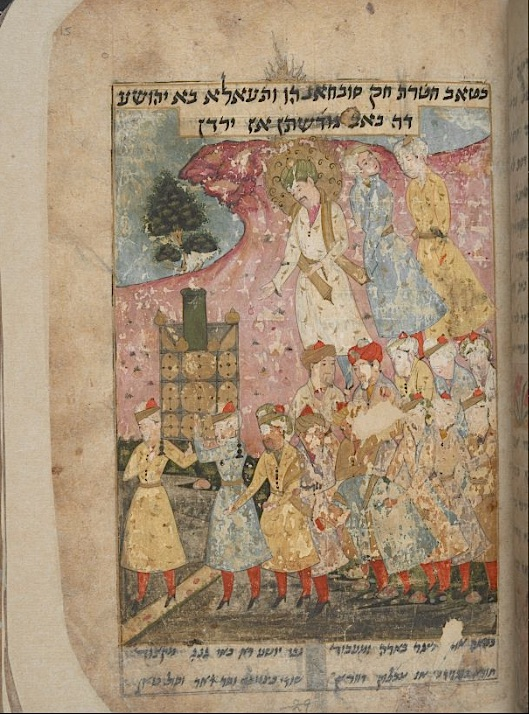
Joshua carrying Ark of the Covenant across the Jordan River in an illuminated manuscript of the Judeo-Persian Fath-nameh

==== Emrani ====
Emrani was a 15th century Persian poet who like Shahin, wrote Persian in Hebrew script. Born in Isfahan, he moved to Kashan in his twenties and lived there until his death. The 10,000-verse Fath-nameh adapts the Books of Joshua, Ruth, and Samuel 1 and 2. Like Shahin’s biblical epics, it displays a strong Shahnameh influence. His Hanuka-nameh is a shorter (1,800 verses) versification of the Maccabees’ rebellion against the Greeks. This work, authored in 1524, relies heavily on the apocryphal First Book of Maccabees. Emrani employs more Hebrew vocabulary than Shahin and relies more on narratives from the Bible and rabbinic literature.

==== Shoftim-nameh ====
Written in 1692 by Aaron ben Mashiah, this versification of the Book of Judges uses the same meter as Emrani’s Fath-nameh.

==== Daniel-nameh ====
In 1606, Khajah of Bukhara versified narratives from the Book of Daniel, apocrypha, and Midrashim (rabbinic commentaries).

=== Mishnah and midrash ===
==== Ganj-nameh ====
Emrani’s Ganj-nameh is a commentary on the Mishnaic ethical tractate Avot. It numbers nearly 5,000 rhyming couplets and includes Sufi terminology. There are many extant manuscripts of this work, indicating its widespread popularity among Persian-speaking Jews. It was completed in 1536 and was likely Emrani’s final work. It is an ethical and didactic work that deals with broader ethical themes compared to his previous writings in this genre. The Ganj-nameh consists of 88 sections that each elaborate a saying or two from the Abot, following the sequence of the Abot itself. The first five sections make up the introduction and follows the structure of many Persian introductions – praise and supplication of God and a history of the work’s composition. Emrani praises Moses. The rest of the Ganj-nameh belongs to the counsel genre prominent in Persian literature and combines the epic, midrashic, mystic and didactic techniques present in Emrani’s earlier works.

=== Biblical commentaries ===
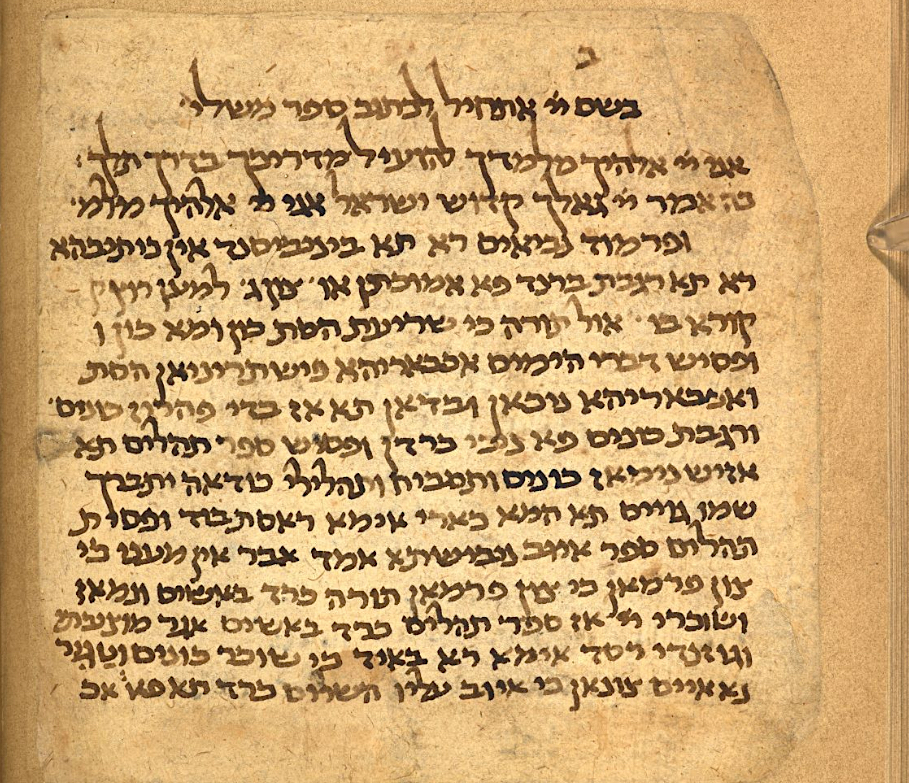
11 or 12th century Judeo-Persian introduction to a commentary on the Book of Proverbs

==== Shimon Hakham: Commentary on Exodus 3-4 ====
Shimon Hakham, a Bukharan rabbi who later emigrated to Jerusalem, edited and published at least 29 works in Judeo-Persian, including a complete edition of Shahin’s Torah commentary. He included alongside this edition his own prose commentary on the Book of Exodus.

=== Historical texts ===
==== Bābāi b. Lutf: Kitab-i Anusi (The Book of a Forced Convert) ====
Babai b. Lutf was a 16th century Jewish author and historian born in Kashan. His 5,000-couplet length Kitab-i Anusi recounts the persecution of Iranian Jews under the reigns of three Safavid shahs: ‘Abbas I, Safi I, and ‘Abbas II who collectively reigned from 1571 to 1666. It focuses on the forced conversions of Jews during this time.

==== Bābāi b. Farhād: Kitāb-i Sar guzasht-i Kāshān (The Book of Events in Kashan) ====
Ibn Lutf’s grandson, Babai b. Farhad, composed a 1,300-couplet chronicle on the persecution faced by Jews in Kashan during the Afghan Invasion of Iran which occurred from 1722 to 1730. Ibn Farhad describes the conversion of Jews in Kashan to Islam and how they were allowed to return to their faith seven months later.

=== Liturgical poems ===
- Haft Barādarān (הפת בראדראן): An epic poem by Emrani read on the fast of Tish'a BeAb based on the story of Hannah and her seven sons
- Sheshom Dar (ששום דר): A poem read on the festival of Shavuot detailing the commandments, based on the Azharot literature
- Shirā-ye Hātāni, or Shira, often beginning with the words "Shodi hātān mobārak bād" (שדִי חתן מבארך באד): Verses sung at weddings and festive occasions. Originally composed for the groom during the Shabbat Hatan (the shabbat following the wedding)
- Aminā:
  - In Praise of Moses
  - A Ghazal on the Twelve Tribes

=== Printing ===
Beginning in the late 19th century, Jerusalem became a center for printing Judeo-Persian literature. Works from many genres were printed, as well as translations of non-Jewish works into Judeo-Persian. Some of the major figures in this movement included Jews from Central Asia such as Shimon Hakham. In 1917, a "Society for the Promotion of the Hebrew Language" was established in Tehran alongside a Judeo-Persian and Hebrew printing press. This group also published a Judeo-Persian newspaper, Ha-Ge'ulah. Two other Judeo-Persian newspapers were also published in Bukhara and Samarkand.

== Characteristics ==
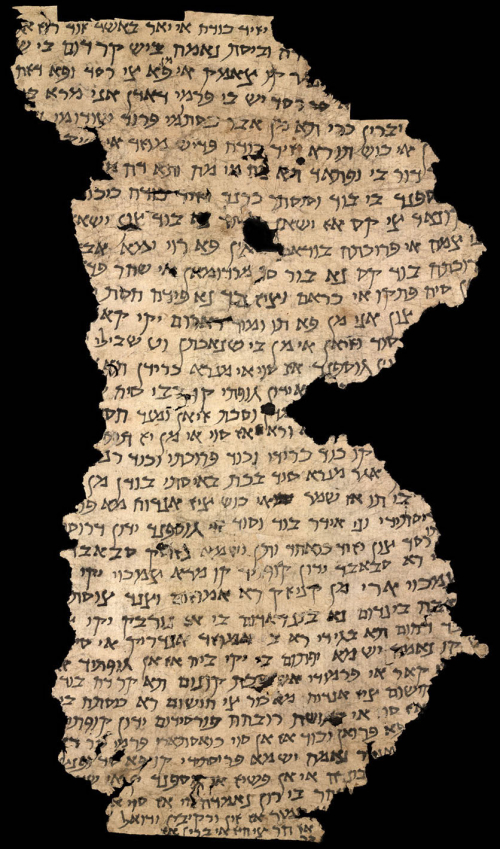
Late 8th century Judeo-Persian document found at Dandan Uiliq

In the absence of a unified dialect of Persian spoken by Jews, Judeo-Persian refers to local dialects spoken by Jews. It is notable for its preservation of certain incorporation of Hebrew words; however, this is less prominent than in other Jewish languages. Judeo-Median is often used to designate the group of dialects spoken by Jewish communities in Central Iran.Early Judeo-Persian writings displays various orthographies that sometimes demonstrate pronunciation differences from Persian. It preserves a transitional stage in certain linguistic features. It also exhibits a variety of constructions for ezafe and for verbs in passive voice. Judeo-Persian versions of the Bible do not follow Persian syntax, instead glossing the Hebrew word-for-word.

=== Contemporary dialects ===
Some of the primary Iranian cities with Jewish dialects are Kashan, Isfahan, Yazd, Kerman, Shiraz, Borujerd, and Hamadan. Vernaculars spoken by Jews in Persian-speaking Central Asia are often referred to as Judeo-Tajik. Judeo-Tat is spoken in the eastern Caucasus and is considered mutually intelligible with standard Persian today. Many speakers of these Iranian dialects have left Iran and few native speakers remain. As a result, Judeo-Median languages are considered endangered according to the Endangered Language Alliance.

== See also ==
- Judeo-Iranian languages
- Judeo-Tat language
- Persian Jews
- Persian Language
- Iranian languages
- History of the Jews in Afghanistan
- Hebrew alphabet
