= Makrani dialect =

Major dialect group of Balochi spoken in Pakistan and Iran

Makrani
- مکرانی
- Makrani written in the Nastaliq font
- Native to: Pakistan, Iran
- Region: Makran
- Language family: Indo-European: Indo-Iranian; Iranian; Western Iranian; Northwestern; Balochi; Western–Southern Balochi; Southern–Koroshi Balochi; Makrani
- Dialects: Coastal; Lashari; Kechi; Karachi
- Writing system: Perso-Arabic script (Balochi alphabet)

Language codes
- ISO 639-2: bcc
- ISO 639-3: bcc – inclusive code Individual code: bcc – Southern Balochi
- Glottolog: sout2642 Southern Balochi makr1243 Makrani
- Linguasphere: 58-AAB-ac

A speaker of Southern (Makrani) Balochi, for the Wikimedia Foundation's Wikitongues

Makrani (Balochi: مکرانی), also referred to as Southern Balochi (زرباری بلۏچی, romanized: Zerbári Balòči), is a variety of the Balochi language spoken in the historical region of Makran (مکران) within Balochistan.

== Background ==
In general, after numerous studies, the Balochi language has three main dialects. The main dialect split is between Western, Southern, and Eastern Balochi.

Makrani is the main branch of Southern Balochi.

== Subdialects ==
Southern Balochi subdialects include Lashari, Sarbazi, Kechi, Karachi and Coastal dialect. They are spoken in the Makran region, which is why all these dialects are generally called Makrani.

Kechi, is the main subdialect spoken in Kech, including Turbat.

Lashari, is the main subdialect centered on the village of Lashar.

The "Coastal Dialects",, including Qasr-e Qand, Nik Shahr, Rask, Bandar Abbas, Karachi, Chahbahar, Gwadar, and Pasni.

== Phonology ==
=== Vowels ===
Southern Balochi vowels
long vowels	â:, ā, ē, ī, ō, ū
Short vowel	â, a, e, i, o, u
Compound vowel	[ie], [ue]

Southern Balochi vowel system
	Front	Central	Back
High	ī		ū
Mid	e,ē		o,ō
Low		ɑ	ō

Vowel systems in Southern Balochi dialects
Scholars	Vowel systems	Dialect
Farrell (1990)	ī, i, ē, a, ā, ō, u, ū, ā͂, ē͂, ī͂, ō͂, ū͂	Karachi
Yousefian (2008)	i, e, ē, a, â, o, ō, u	Lashari

It is similar to that of Koroshi dialect spoken in Iran. Nasalization, which is common in Southern Balochi dialects, is phonetically less salient in Koroshi.

=== Consonants ===
The consonants /b/ ، /d/ ، /ḍ/ ، /g/ ، /p/ ، /t/ ، /ṭ/ ، /k/ ، /P/ /h/ ،/tʰ/ ،/ṭʰ/ ، /k/ /h/ ،/s/ ،/z/ ،/ʃ/ ،/ȝ/ ،/h/ ،/ʤ/ ، ʧ ،/ʧʰ/ ،/m/ ،/n/ ،/ŋ/ ،/r/ ،/ṛ/ ،/l/ ،/w/ ،/j/ are articulated as alveolar in Southern Balochi.

Nasalization is phonemic in Eastern Balochi and that caused by the effect of the Indo-Aryan languages, similar to Soleimani dialect that has borrowed a few sounds from them.

Consonants in Southern Balochi dialects
		Labial	Dental/ Alveolar	Retroflex	Palatal	Velar	Glottal
Plosive/ Affricate	voiceless	p	t	t̥	č	k	
Plosive/ Affricate	voiced	b	d	d̥	J̌	ɡ	
Fricative	voiceless	(ƒ)	s		Š	(x)	h
Fricative	voiced	β	z		ž	(ǧ)	
Nasal		m	n				
Taps			r	r̥			
Glides		w			y		

The consonants /f x ġ/ in the Rakhshani dialect often remain, but in Makrani they become /g/, /k/ or /h/, and /p/, respectively. In addition, /f/ occurs in a few words in Southern Balochi. /x/ (voiceless velar fricative) in some loanwords in Southern Balochi corresponding to /ʁ/ (voiced uvular fricative) in Western Balochi.

=== Syllables ===
Makrani dialect, the presence of minimal pairs such as [iehd] - [iḳd] or [suek] - [suk] easily shows that each compound vowel can be placed as a single, independent phoneme in the center of a syllable and create new word with semantic distinction.

Southern dialects as in Lashari Balochi the place of stress depends on the weight of the syllable.

== Grammar ==
Makrani dialect uses both head-marking and dependent-marking structures. In this dialect, the verb group can take four types of complements: the noun group, the adjective group, the prepositional group, and the complement clause. The Balochi Makrani dialect uses the adverb of quantity and the prepositional group as descriptors of the core adjective in the adjectival group. The prepositional group is described by adverbs.

These adverbs come before the core preposition. Southern Balochi has genitive singular -ē and the object is marked with: ānā (rā), -ânā, or -ānrā.

=== Pronouns ===
Pronouns	Rakhshani (Western)	Makrani (Southern)
1st person	من	من
2nd person	تو	تو
3rd person	آ‌/آئی	آ/آیی
1st person (plural)	ئما‌/هما	مشما‌/ما
2nd person (plural)	شما	شما
3rd person (plural)	آوان	آیاں

== Example sentences ==
English	Southern Balochi
"Goodbye"	خدا حافظ
"What is this?"	اے چی اِنت؟
"Where is Ali?"	علی کجا اِنت؟
"This horse is white"	اے اسپ اسپیت ئے
"Who called me?"	کہ منا توار کو؟
"I am tired"	من ژند اں
"I have two small brothers and sisters"	منا دو کسانیں برات ءُ گوار هست

=== Makrani v. Karachi ===
English	Makrani	Karachi
"I am Mahnaz"	من مَهناز اں	من مَهناز اں
"Where are they going?"	آ کجا روگ اِنت؟	آ کجا روگا اِنت؟
"What are you doing?"	تو چی کنگ ئے؟	تو چی کنگا ئے؟
"Friend, tell me what is happening?"	سنگت، منا بہ گوش چی بیگ اِنت؟	یار، منا بہ گوش چی بوئگا اِنت؟

== See also ==
- Rakhshani dialect
- Soleimani dialect
