= Davani =

Davani may refer to:

- Davani (surname)
- Davani, a dress worn by south Indian girls
- Davani dialect, an Iranian dialect or language spoken in southern Iran
