= Afro-Iranians =

Racial group

ایرانیان آفریقایی‌تبار
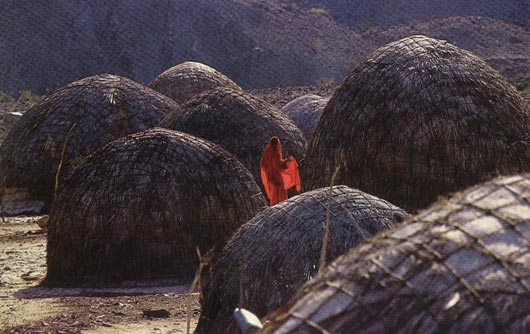
- Huts in the Afro-Iranian village of Lashar

Regions with significant populations
- Sistan and Balochestan, Hormozgan, Bushehr, Khuzestan, Fars

Languages
- Majority Persian, minority Arabic and Balochi

Religion
- Islam (predominantly Shia; Sunni)

Related ethnic groups
- Zanj

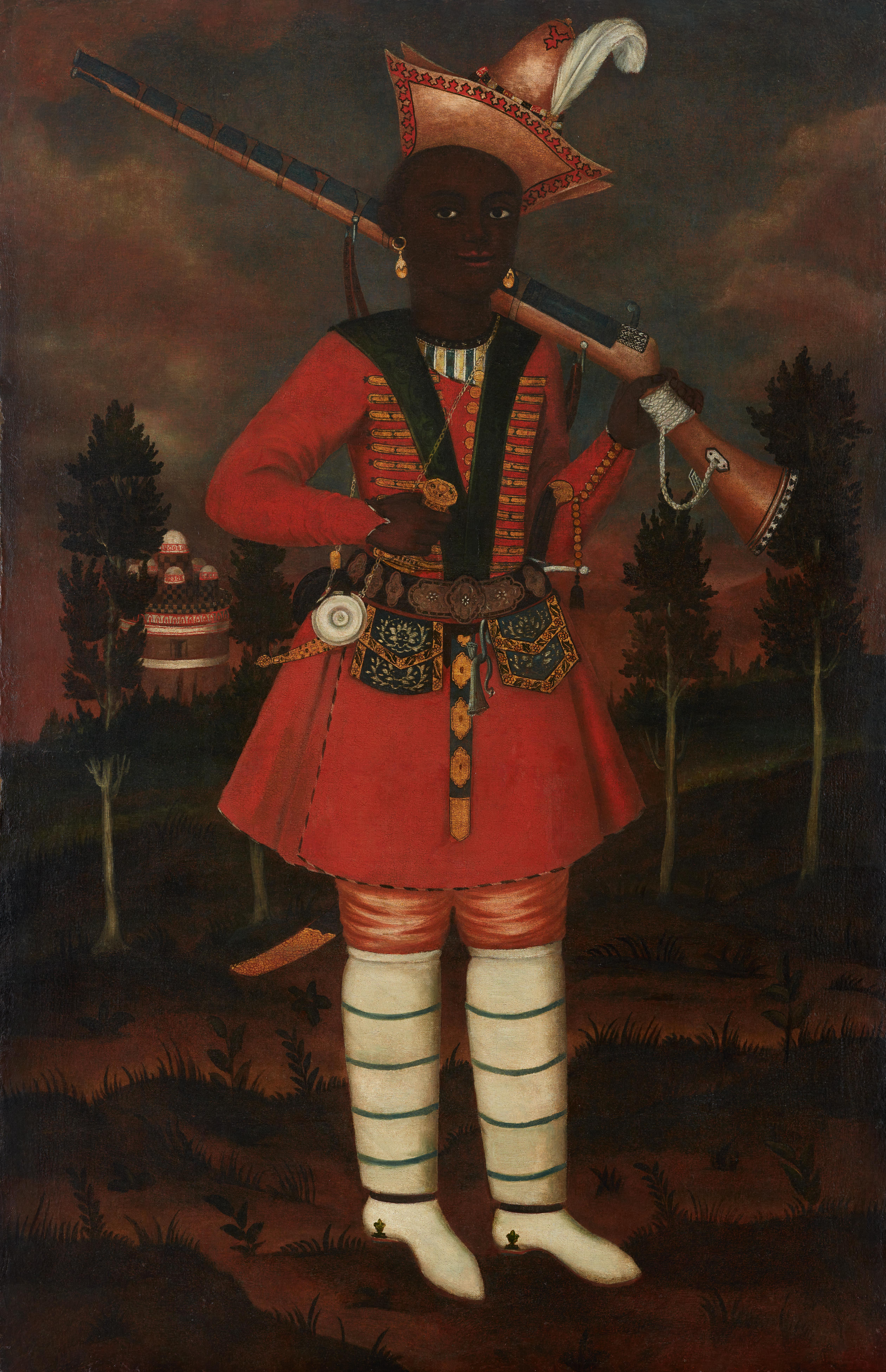
A Safavid oil painting of an African soldier in Safavid Iran. Created in Isfahan in the last quarter of the 17th century, the figure was most likely a slave soldier in Safavid Iran's musketeer corps

Afro-Iranians (Persian: ایرانیان آفریقایی‌تبار) refers to Iranian people with significant black ancestry. Most Afro-Iranians are concentrated in the southern provinces of Iran, including Hormozgan, Sistan and Balochistan, Bushehr, Khuzestan, and Fars. They are split between Afro-Iranians who identify as Persians, Iranian Arabs, or Balochs.

== History ==
The Indian Ocean slave trade was multi-directional and changed over time. To meet the demand for menial labor, enslaved black people who were captured by Arab slave traders were sold in cumulatively large numbers over centuries to; the Persian Gulf, Egypt, Arabia, India, the Far East, the Indian Ocean islands and Ethiopia. Others came as immigrants throughout many millennia or from Portuguese slave traders who occupied most of the contested Ormus's Bandar Abbas, Hormoz and Qeshm island ports in southern Iran by early 16th century.

During Qajar rule, many wealthy households imported Black African women and children to perform domestic work alongside Circassian slaves. This was largely drawn from the Zanj, who were Bantu-speaking peoples that lived alongside Southeast Africa. In an area roughly comprising modern-day Tanzania, Mozambique and Malawi. Under British pressure, Mohammad Shah Qajar issued a firman suppressing slave trade in 1848. Iran abolished slavery in 1929.

== Notable Afro-Iranians ==
- Abdolreza Barzegari, footballer
- Abdul Karim Farhani, Iranian Shia cleric, Assembly of Experts member
- Adnan Afravian, Iranian actor known for playing in Bashu, the Little Stranger
- Alex Eskandarkhah, filmmaker
- Ali Firouzi, footballer and coach
- Dennis Walker, footballer of Afro-Iranian descent, first black player to play for Manchester United
- Marzieh Hashemi, journalist and TV presenter at Press TV
- Mehrab Shahrokhi, footballer
- Mohammad Ali Mousavi Jazayeri, Iranian Shia cleric, Assembly of Experts member (Afro-Ahwazi Arab)
- Mohammad Marani, a brigadier general of the Islamic Revolutionary Guard Corps
- Ali Azmaei, a brigadier general of the Islamic Revolutionary Guard Corps
- Shanbehzadeh Ensemble, Iranian folk band

== See also ==
- Afro-Asians
- Zanj
- Siddi, people of Zanj descent in Pakistan and India.
- Shirazi people, Bantu inhabiting the Swahili coast.
- Afro-Arabs
- Afro-Turks
- Slavery in Iran
- Haji Firuz, fictional blackface character in Iranian folklore.
