= Rafael Lozano-Hemmer =

Mexican Canadian artist

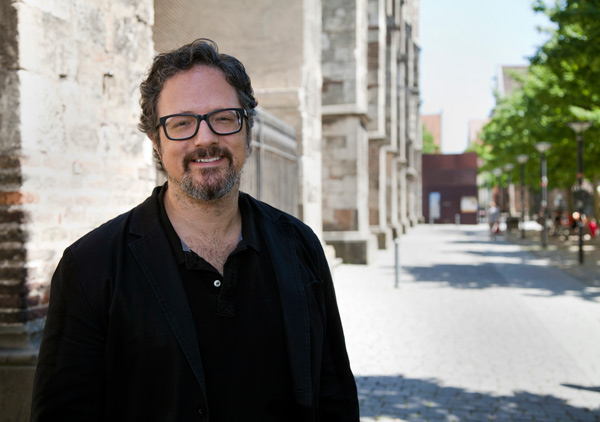
- Born: 17 November 1967 (age 58); Mexico City
- Education: Bachelor of Science in Physical Chemistry from Concordia University in Montreal
- Known for: electronic artist
- Website: www.lozano-hemmer.com

Rafael Lozano-Hemmer RCA (born 1967 in Mexico City) is a Mexican-Canadian electronic artist living and working in Montreal, Quebec, Canada. He creates interactive works. He emphasizes that his installations are incomplete without public participation, treating audience participation as an essential material in his creative process. His interactive works are "anti-monuments for people to self-represent."

He emigrated to Canada in 1985 to study at the University of Victoria in British Columbia and then received his Bachelor of Science in Physical Chemistry from Concordia University in Montreal. The son of Mexico City nightclub owners, Lozano-Hemmer was drawn to science but could not resist joining the creative activities of his friends. Initially he worked in a molecular recognition lab in Montreal and published his research in Chemistry journals. Though he did not pursue the sciences as a direct career, it has influenced his work in many ways, providing conceptual inspiration and practical approaches to create his work.

== Biography ==
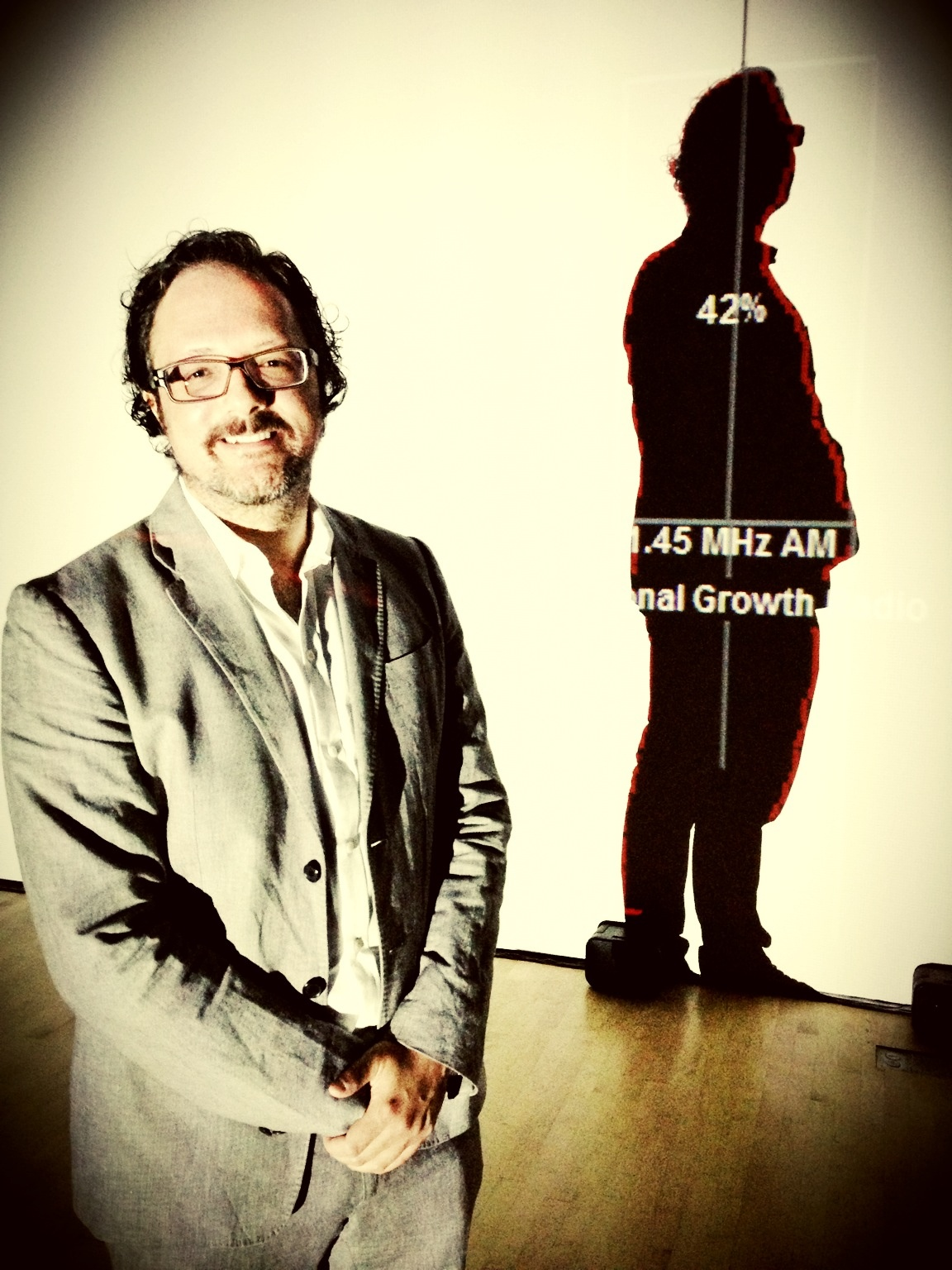
Lozano-Hemmer in 2012

Lozano-Hemmer is best known for creating and presenting theatrical interactive installations in public spaces around the world. Using robotics, real-time computer graphics, film projections, positional sound, internet links, cell phone interfaces, video and ultrasonic sensors, LED screens and other devices, his installations seek to interrupt the increasingly homogenized urban condition by providing critical platforms for participation. Lozano-Hemmer's smaller-scaled sculptural and video installations explore themes of perception, deception and surveillance. As an outgrowth of these various large scale and performance-based projects Lozano-Hemmer documents the works in photography editions that are also exhibited.

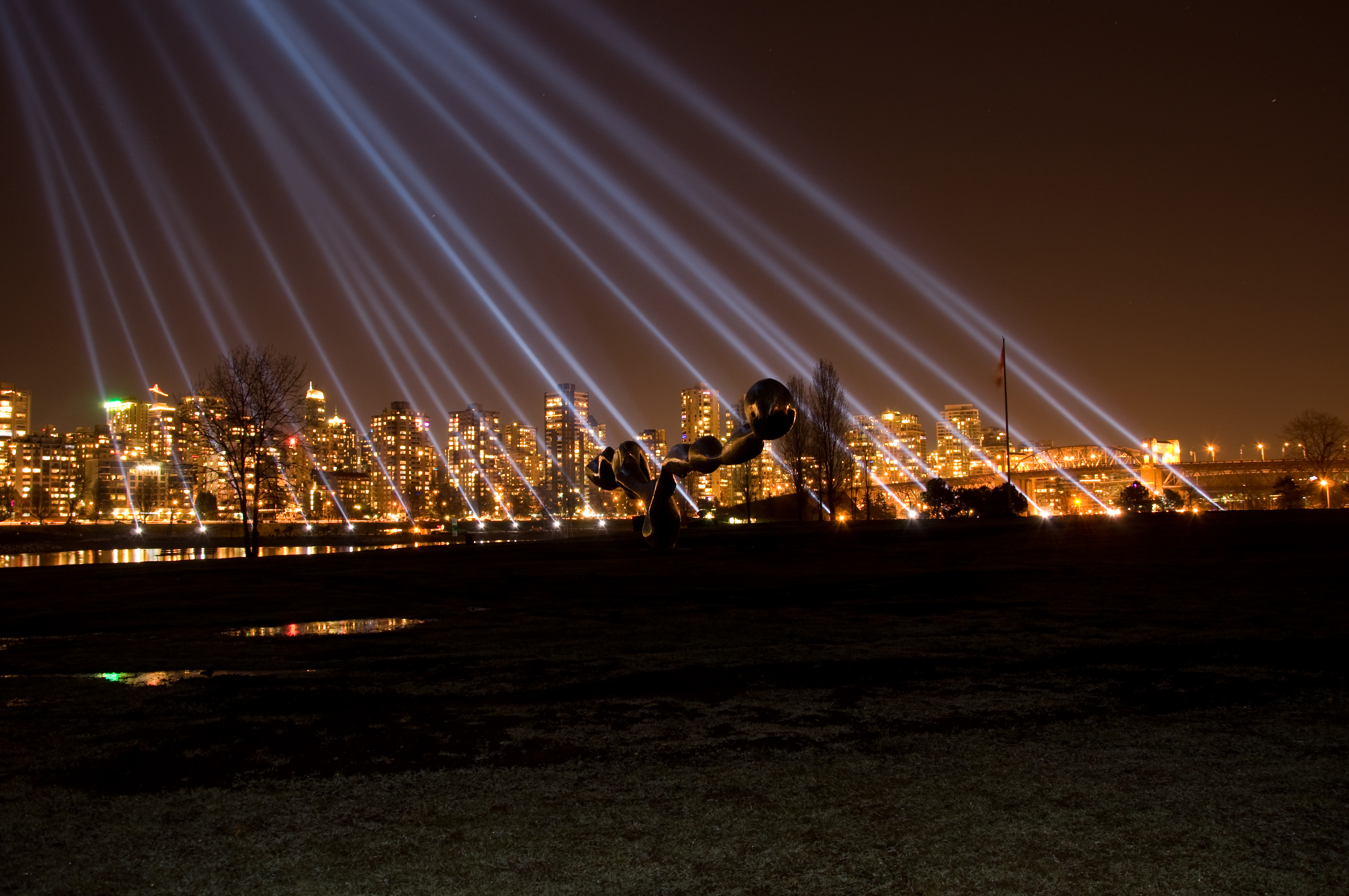
"Vectorial Elevation"; Vancouver 2010

Lozano-Hemmer is represented by bitforms gallery (New York), Galería Max Estrella (Madrid), Wilde Gallery (Geneva, Basel, and Zürich), and PACE Gallery (Worldwide). His work has been shown at fairs such as Art Basel (Basel, Miami, and Hong Kong), Frieze (London and LA), Armory Show (New York), ARCO (Madrid), Zona Maco (Mexico), Paris Photo, and Art Cologne. He has shown three times at Art Basel Unlimited.

== Publications ==
Ten monographs have been published featuring essays by writers such as Cuauhtémoc Medina, Scott McQuire, John Hanhardt, Rodrigo Alonso, Beryl Graham, Cecilia Fajardo-Hill, Manuel De Landa, Victor Stoichita, Barbara London, Geert Lovink, Brian Massumi. Lozano-Hemmer's own writing has appeared, for example, in Kunstforum (Germany), Leonardo (USA), Performance Research (UK), and Archis (Netherlands).

=== Rafael Lozano-Hemmer: Unstable Presence ===
Edited by Rudolf Frieling and François LeTourneux.

"This mid-career monograph offers a nuanced perspective on contemporary artist Rafael Lozano-Hemmer's oeuvre. Rafael Lozano-Hemmer's installations engage the audience in unique and seductive ways—measuring their heart rate, surveilling their faces, even circulating their breath. Often characterized by particular interactions between the work and the viewer, Lozano-Hemmer's art explores themes such as forced cohabitations, power imbalances, and contemporary techniques of surveillance and control. This mid-career retrospective book focuses on works produced over the past two decades. It includes essays that explore the poetic and political dimensions of the artist's work, along with in-depth examinations of four major pieces—Zoom Pavilion, Vicious Circular Breathing, Voz Alta, and Pulse Room. It also features full-color illustrations of 16 recent works, including a newly created immersive sound environment, Sphere Packing: Bach. An essential guide to a deeper understanding of the themes that connect these technically sophisticated and emotionally resonant works, this book draws on the idea of an "unstable presence" to communicate the humanity and the anxiety that lie at the center of Lozano-Hemmer's art."

== Museums and permanent collections ==
Over two-dozen permanent architectural pieces for public and private buildings have been installed around the world. These include Planet Word Museum of Language in Washington D.C., Maison Manuvie in Montréal, ATT in Dallas, Museum of Old, and New Art in Hobart, Science Museum in London, AmorePacific Museum in Seoul, PHI Centre and MAC in Montréal, and Fidelity Headquarters in Boston, London, and Dalian.

=== Pulse Room (2006) ===
Is an interactive installation featuring over 300 hundred clear incandescent light bulbs, 300 W each, hung by cables three metres from the floor. The bulbs are uniformly distributed over the exhibition room, filling it completely. An interface placed on one side of the room has a sensor that detects the heart rate of participants. When someone holds the interface, a computer detects his or her pulse and immediately sets off the closest bulb to flash at the exact rhythm of his or her heart. The moment the interface is released, all the lights turn off briefly, and the flashing sequence advances by one position down the queue to the next bulb in the grid. Each time someone touches the interface, a heart pattern is recorded and sent to the first bulb in the grid, pushing ahead all the existing recordings. At any given time, the installation will show the recordings from the most recent participants.

=== Vicious Circular Breathing (2015) ===
Is a hermetically sealed apparatus that invites the public to breathe the air previously breathed by participants before them. It consists of a glass room with double sliding doors, two emergency exits, carbon dioxide and oxygen sensors, a set of motorized bellows, an electromagnetic valve system, and 61 brown paper bags hanging from respiration tubes.

In the piece, visitors' breath is kept circulating and made tangible by automatically inflating and deflating the brown paper bags around 10,000 times a day, the typical respiratory frequency for an adult at rest. There are 61 bags because that constitutes 5 octaves, a typical range of musical organs that inspire the design.

The piece includes warnings for asphyxiation, contagion, and panic, producing a faint mechanical sound, a quiet whir from the air flow, and a louder crackle from the crumpling bags.

To participate, an audience member presses a button on the outside of the glass prism. They can then enter a vestibule and wait for it to be decompressed. Once they enter the main chamber, they sit down and breathe the recycled air.

=== A Crack in the Hourglass (2020) ===
In this participatory artwork, a modified robotic plotter deposits grains of hourglass sand onto a black surface to recreate the images of those lost due to COVID-19. After each portrait is completed, the surface tilts and the same sand is recycled into the next portrait, echoing the collective and ongoing nature of the pandemic. Those seeking a way to mourn loved ones lost during the pandemic are invited to participate by submitting a photograph of the deceased accompanied by a personalized dedication. The resulting memorials are available, via livestream and in archive form on the project’s website.

The project was originally commissioned by MUAC Museum in Mexico City and was shown at the Brooklyn Museum for six months.

Art21 made an episode about this artwork, "Episode 280: In the midst of loss and isolation, an artist's anti-monument, 'A Crack in the Hourglass' (2021), brings communities together to mourn, remember, and feel connected again."

== Public art commissions ==
Large-scale interactive installations have been commissioned for events such as the Millennium Celebrations in Mexico City (1999), the Cultural Capital of Europe in Rotterdam (2001), the UN World Summit of Cities in Lyon (2003), the opening of the YCAM Center in Japan (2003), the Expansion of the European Union in Dublin (2004), the memorial for the Tlatelolco Student Massacre in Mexico City (2008), the Winter Olympics in Vancouver (2010), the pre-opening exhibition of the Guggenheim in Abu Dhabi (2015), the activation of the Augusta Raurica Roman Theatre in Basel (2018), and the sound to light intervention across the US-Mexico border in Ciudad Juárez and El Paso (2019).

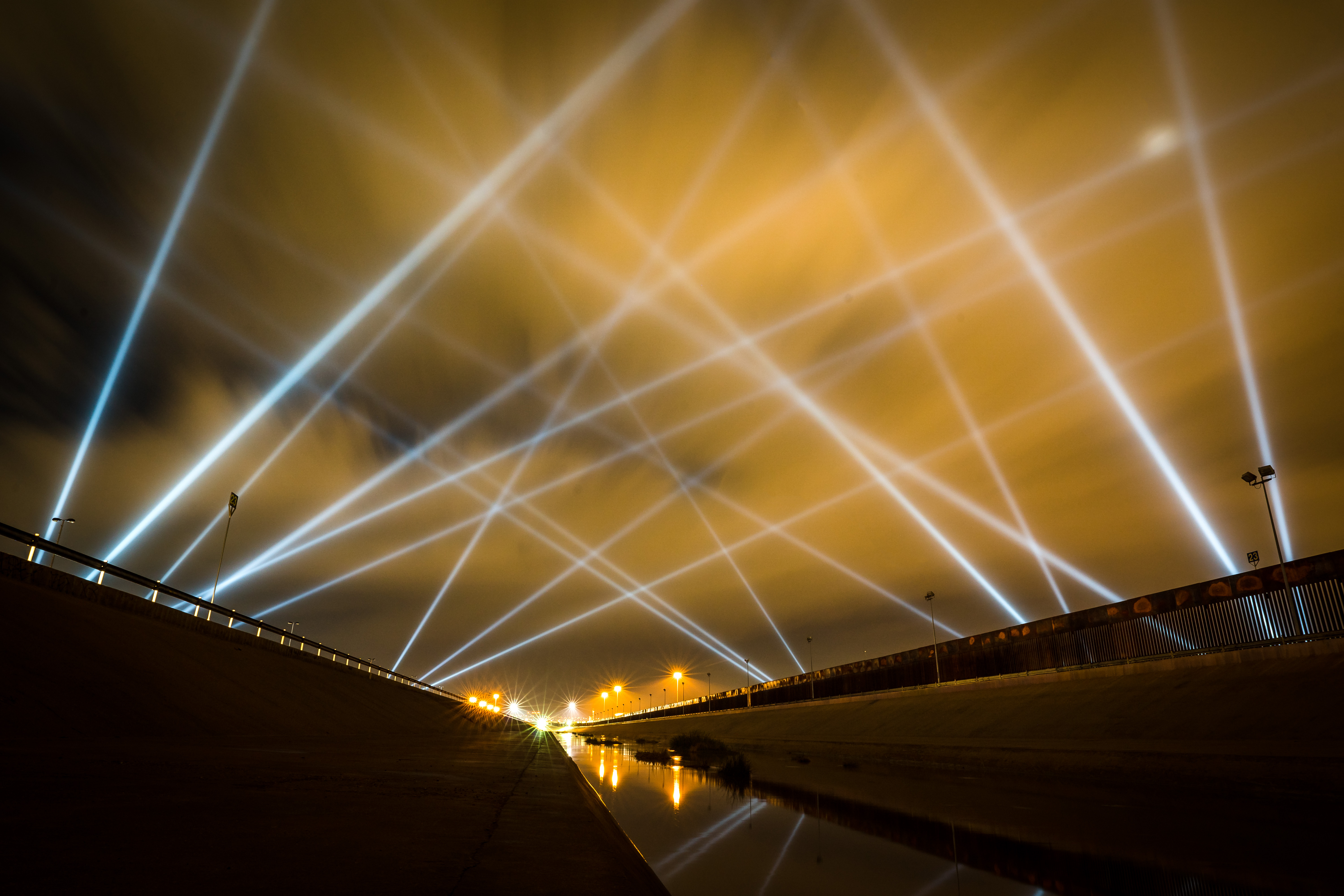
Shown here: Rafael Lozano-Hemmer: Border Tuner / Sintonizador Fronterizo, Bowie High-School / Parque Chamizal, El Paso / Ciudad Juárez, Texas / Chihuahua, United States / México, 2019.

=== Border Tuner / Sintonizador Fronterizo (2019) ===
Border Tuner was a large-scale, participatory art installation designed to interconnect the cities of El Paso, Texas, and Ciudad Juárez, Chihuahua. Powerful searchlights make "bridges of light" that open live sound channels for communication across the US-Mexico border. Each of the interactive Border Tuner stations featured a microphone, a speaker and a large wheel or dial. As a participant turned the dial, three nearby searchlights created an "arm" of light that followed the movement of the dial, automatically scanning the horizon. When two such "arms of light" met in the sky and intersected, a bidirectional channel of sound was opened between the people at the two remote stations. As they spoke and heard each other, the brightness of the "light bridge" modulated in sync, creating a glimmer similar to a Morse code scintillation. Every interactive station could tune into any other, so for example, a participant in Mexico could connect to the three US-based stations or to the other two in Mexico.

The project brought together tens of thousands of people, reuniting families on both sides of the border, creating new connections, performing poetry recitals and serenades, observing mournful vigils, and staging the vibrancy of the diverse culture and activism in the region.

Art:21 presented "this special extended segment as a complement to the 'Borderlands' episode from the tenth season of the Art in the Twenty-First Century series. Edited to focus on a singular artist narrative, this film contains original material not included in the television broadcast."

=== Speaking Willow (2020) ===
A metal tree sculpture, covered in living vine and ivy, features hundreds of hanging loudspeakers which detect the presence of a visitor underneath and, in response, play quiet voice recordings in one of 400 different languages. Each speaker contains recordings in a different language, obtained from the Wikitongues language preservation project. The speakers also light up on playback to create a glimmering effect similar to fireflies. If no visitor is around, the tree quietly plays back bird songs from hundreds of species.

Curated by the Public Art Fund for the courtyard of the new Planet Word Museum of Language in Washington D.C., the piece was fabricated by UAP in New York.

== Performances ==
=== Levels of Nothingness (2009) ===
Collaboration with Brian Massumi and Isabella Rossellini

Levels of Nothingness is an installation-performance commissioned for the 50th Anniversary of the Guggenheim Museum, inspired by Kandinsky's opera, "The Yellow Sound" (1912). In "Levels of Nothingness", the human voice is analyzed by computers, automatically controlling a full rig of Rock-and-Roll concert lighting and creating an interactive colour show. For the New York performances, Isabella Rossellini read a libretto co-written by Brian Massumi, which included seminal philosophical texts on skepticism, colour and perception, including writings by Kandinsky, Deleuze, Sanches, Simon Baron-Cohen and Alexander Luria. Following the performances, audience members could test the colour-generating microphone.

=== Sync, a performance with Eli Keszler (2022) ===
Sync is an audiovisual collaboration between artist Rafael Lozano-Hemmer and percussionist, composer, and artist Eli Keszler. Taking place amid Lozano-Hemmer's first solo exhibition at PACE Gallery New York, this one-off performance centers on the immersive, biometric artwork Pulse Topology.

Consisting of 3,000 suspended lightbulbs that glimmer in tune with activity detected by pulse sensors, the installation, which typically records participants' heartbeats, is activated by Keszler's distinctive drumming in Sync. Using a Sensory Percussion system by Sunhouse, Keszler triggered and controlled a series of mesmeric lighting patterns—what he terms a "morphing geography of light"—in Pulse Topology over the course of his performance.

=== Storm Riders Hörspiel, Denmark (1992) ===
Hörspiel (radio play) by English composer and Poet Dick Higgins, written and recorded at the Banff Centre for the Arts in Canada in 1991. Lozano- Hemmer played the part of Stravinsky in performances in Banff and at the Alberta College of Art.

== Art parcours and Inversive exhibitions ==
=== Listening Forest (2022) ===
An art walk designed to transform Crystal Bridges Museum of American Art's North Forest at night, featuring eight large-scale interactive artworks to create an interactive pathway. Using technology that responded to visitors' voices, heartbeats, and body heat, "Listening Forest" highlighted the unique physical characteristics of participants while simultaneously establishing connections between them and the landscape itself.

=== Atmospheric Memory, Sydney (2023) ===
Computer pioneer Charles Babbage suggested that the air surrounding us is a "vast library" containing every sound, motion and word spoken. Two hundred years later, Atmospheric Memory explores this idea at a moment when perfect recollection is one of the defining conditions of our digital life, and the air that we breathe has become a battleground for the future of our planet.

Atmospheric Memory uses new interactive artworks to transform vibrations in the atmosphere into something visitors can see, hear and even touch. Presented at the Powerhouse Ultimo Museum, the exhibition's works include a voice-controlled fountain where spoken words momentarily hang in the air as water vapour; a room with over 3,000 different channels of natural and unnatural sounds; a voice-controlled light beacon, and the world's first 3D printed speech bubble. On view are also original artifacts from the XIX Century including prototypes of the Analytical Engine, Edison's first phonograph, and a first edition of Babbage's treatise.

Atmospheric Memory headlined the Sydney Science Festival, and was originally commissioned by Factory International for the Manchester International Festival. Curated by José Luis de Vicente.

=== Translation Island (2023) ===
Translation Island consists of ten audiovisual artworks that transformed Lulu Island, a deserted island right across the water from downtown Abu Dhabi. Visitors were welcome to interact with the artworks by walking a 2 km path inside the island, alongside sand dunes, desert flora, beaches, and fresh water lakes.

The installations use technologies such as AI, computer vision, environmental sensors, and 3D mapping to create poetic shared experiences in a desert landscape. "Collider", for instance, detects invisible cosmic radiation arriving on Earth from stars and black holes, translating the radiation and making it visible as gentle ripples along a colossal curtain of light that can be seen from a 10 km radius. Other works such as "Dune Ringers", and "Pulse Island" make tangible our own biometric signatures. Several installations are literally live translations of language. "Translation Stream" is a fluid stream of letters, projected onto the sandy trail, which organize themselves around visitors, revealing the poetry of contemporary Emirati poets in both English and Arabic. Meanwhile, "Shadow Tuner" allows visitors to use their shadow to tune-in up to 12,000 live streams of radio from around the world, and "Translation Lake" uses AI voice avatars to endlessly translate James Joyce's recondite masterpiece "Finnegan's Wake" into 24 languages, celebrating the impossibility and absurdity of fluid machine translation of complex human literature.

== Relational architecture ==
In 1994, Lozano-Hemmer coined the term "relational architecture" as the technological actualization of buildings and the urban environment with alien memory. He aimed to transform the dominant narratives of a specific building or urban setting by superimposing audiovisual elements to affect it, effect it and re-contextualize it. From 1997 to 2006, he built ten works of relational architecture beginning with Displaced Emperors and ending with Under Scan. Lozano-Hemmer says, "I want buildings to pretend to be something other than themselves, to engage in a kind of dissimulation"

== Technology ==
Lozano-Hemmer differs from many artists in his comprehensive use of technology; most of his productions contain more than one element of technology to create a lasting effect. Lozano-Hemmer recognizes that Western culture is a technology-based culture, emphasizing "even if you are not using a computer you are affected by this environment. Working with technology is inevitable." "Our politics, our culture, our economy, everything is running through globalized networks of communication..."

Technologies that Lozano-Hemmer has used in his works include robotics, custom software, projections, internet links, cell phones, sensors, LEDs, cameras, and tracking systems.

== Notable exhibitions ==
- A Draft of Shadows Bildmuseet, Umeå University, Sweden. November 2, 2014 – April 26, 2015
- Rafael Lozano-Hemmer: Translation Island (curated by: Reem Fadda and Alia Zaal Sultan Lootah), Department of Culture and Tourism of Abu Dhabi, Abu Dhabi, United Arab Emirates, November 20 – December 31.
- Lumiere 2023 (curated by: Helen Marriage), Lumiere Festival Durham, Durham, United Kingdom, November 16 – November 19.
- Rafael Lozano-Hemmer: Vicious Circular Breathing (curated by: Kathleen Forde), Borusan Contemporary, Istanbul, Turkey, September 14 – February 16, 2014.

== Awards ==
- Governor General's Awards in Visual and Media Arts, Ottawa, Canada 2015.
- Interactive Art Honorable Mention, Ars Electronica 2013, Linz, Austria 2013.
- Joyce Award, The Joyce Foundation, Chicago, Illinois, United States 2012.
- BAFTA British Academy Award for Interactive Art 2005, London, United Kingdom 2005.
- Artist/Performer of the year, Wired Magazine Rave Awards, San Francisco, California, United States 2003.
- Rockefeller-Ford Fellowship, New York City, New York, United States 2003.
- Trophée des Lumiéres, Lyon, France 2003.
- World Technology Network Award for the Arts, San Francisco, California, United States 2003.
- BAFTA British Academy Award for Interactive Art 2002, London, United Kingdom 2002.
- Gold Award, Interactive Media Design Review 2002, I.D. Magazine, United States 2002.
- Interactive Art Distinction, Ars Electronica 2002, Linz, Austria 2002.
- International Bauhaus Award 2002, 1st Prize, Dessau, Germany 2002.
- Distinction, SFMOMA Webby Awards 2000, San Francisco, California, United States 2000.
- Excellence Award, Media Arts Festival 2000, CG Arts, Tokyo, Japan 2000.
- Finalist, Medienkunstpreis 2000, ZKM, Karlsruhe, Germany 2000.
- Interactive Art Golden Nica, Ars Electronica 2000, Linz, Austria 2000.
- Interactive Art Honorable Mention, Ars Electronica 1998, Linz, Austria 1998.
- Best Installation, Interactive Digital Media Awards 1996, Toronto, Ontario, Canada 1996.
- 2nd Prize, Cyberstar, Köln, Germany, June 1995.
- Interactive Art Honorable Mention, Ars Electronica 1995, Linz, Austria 1995.
