= Kazeruni =

Kazeruni may refer to:

- Old Kazeruni language, an extinct Iranian language of Kazeruni people
- Kazeruni, an Iranian family name; an inhabitant of Kazerun or its present Persian dialect
- Abul Ishaq Ibrahim Kazeruni, a Sufi
- Sadid al-Din Muhammad ibn Mas‘ud Kazerouni an Iranian 14th century physician
