= Balochi language =

North-Western Iranian language

Balochi
- بلۏچی
- Balochi written in Nastaliq
- Pronunciation: [bəˈloːt͡ʃiː]
- Native to: Pakistan, Iran, Afghanistan, Oman
- Region: Balochistan
- Ethnicity: Baloch
- Native speakers: 8.8 million (2017–2020)
- Language family: Indo-European: Indo-Iranian; Iranian; Western Iranian; Northwestern; Balochi
- Writing system: Perso-Arabic script (Balochi alphabet)

Official status
- Regulated by: Balochi Academy, Quetta, Balochistan, Pakistan; Balochi Academy Sarbaz, Sarbaz, Iran

Language codes
- ISO 639-2: bal
- ISO 639-3: bal – inclusive code Individual codes: bgp – Eastern Balochi bgn – Western Balochi bcc – Southern Balochi
- Glottolog: balo1260
- Linguasphere: 58-AAB-a
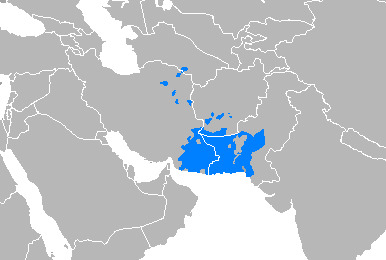
- Map of areas in which Balochi (shown in blue) is spoken significantly

Balochi (also rendered as Baluchi), (Note: IPA: [bɐloːtʃiː]) is a Northwestern Iranian language, spoken by the Baloch people in the Balochistan region of Pakistan, Iran, and Afghanistan. In addition, there are speakers in Oman, the Arab states of the Persian Gulf, Turkmenistan, East Africa, and in diaspora communities of other parts of the world. The total number of speakers, according to Ethnologue, is 8.8 million.

Balochi varieties constitute a dialect continuum and collectively at least have 10 million native speakers. The main varieties of Balochi are Eastern (Soleimani), Southern (Makrani) and Western (Rakhshani). Koroshi is a dialect of the Balochi language, spoken mainly in the provinces of Fars and Hormozgan of Iran. However, Josef Elfenbein of Encyclopædia Iranica divides the dialects of the Balochi language into six categories: Rakhshani, Panjguri, Saravani, Lashari, Kechi, and the "Coastal Dialects".

According to Brian Spooner:

Literacy for most Baloch-speakers is not in Balochi, but in Urdu in Pakistan and Persian in Afghanistan and Iran. Even now, very few Baloch read Balochi in any of the countries, regardless of the alphabet in which it is printed.

Balochi belongs to the Western Iranian subgroup, and its original homeland is suggested to be around the central Caspian region. Balochi uses the letter Waw with a diacritic in its spelling (ۏ).

== Classification ==
Balochi is an Indo-European language, spoken by the Baloch and belonging to the Indo-Iranian branch of the family. As an Iranian language, it is classified within the Northwestern Iranian group.

Glottolog classifies four different varieties, namely Koroshi, Southern Balochi and Western Balochi (grouped under a "Southern-Western Balochi" branch), and Eastern Balochi, all under the "Balochic" group.

- Northwestern Iranian
  - Balochic
    - Eastern Balochi (Bugti, Kasrani, Leghari, Marri, Mazari, Upper Sindhi Balochi)
    - Southern-Western Balochi
      - Southern-Western Balochi-Koroshi
        - Koroshi (Coastal Koroshi, Inland Koroshi)
        - Southern Balochi (Coastal Balochi [Kechi, Barahuwi, Bashgaadi, Huuti Karachi Balochi Makrani], Kechi)
      - Western Balochi
        - Lashari (Bampuri, Iranshahr)
        - Rakhshani (Kalati Balochi, Panjguri, Sarhaddi Balochi [Afghanistan Balochi, Sistani Balochi, Turkmenistan Balochi])

According to the research of Swedish academic Carina Jahani, ISO 639-3 groups Southern, Eastern, and Western Baloch under the Balochi macrolanguage, keeping Koroshi separate.

== Phonology ==
=== Vowels ===
The Balochi vowel system has at least eight vowels: five long and three short. These are /aː/, /eː/, /iː/, /oː/, /uː/, /a/, /i/ and /u/. The short vowels have more centralized phonetic quality than the long vowels. The variety spoken in Karachi also has nasalized vowels, most importantly /ẽː/ and /ãː/. In addition to these eight vowels, Balochi has two vowel glides, that is /aw/ and /aj/.

=== Consonants ===
The following table shows consonants which are common to both Western (Northern) and Southern Balochi. The consonants /s/, /z/, /n/, /ɾ/ and /l/ are articulated as alveolar in Western Balochi. The plosives /t/ and /d/ are dental in both dialects. The symbol ń is used to denote nasalization of the preceding vowel.

		Labial	Dental/ Alveolar	Retroflex	Palatal	Velar	Glottal
Plosive/ Affricate	voiceless	p	t	ʈ	t͡ʃ	k	ʔ
Plosive/ Affricate	voiced	b	d	ɖ	d͡ʒ	ɡ	ʔ
Fricative	voiceless	f	s		ʃ		h (Note: Word-initial /h/ is dropped in Balochi as spoken in Karachi.)
Fricative	voiced		z		ʒ (Note: Words with /ʒ/ are uncommon.)		h
Rhotic			ɾ	ɽ (Note: The retroflex tap has a very limited distribution.)			
Nasal		m	n				
Approximant		w	l		j		

In addition, /f/ occurs in a few words in Southern Balochi. /x/ (voiceless velar fricative) in some loanwords in Southern Balochi corresponding to /χ/ (voiceless uvular fricative) in Western Balochi; and /ɣ/ (voiced velar fricative) in some loanwords in Southern Balochi corresponding to /ʁ/ (voiced uvular fricative) in Western Balochi.

In Eastern Balochi, it is noted that the stop and glide consonants may also occur as aspirated allophones in word initial position as [pʰ tʰ ʈʰ t͡ʃʰ kʰ] and [wʱ]. Allophones of stops in postvocalic position include for voiceless stops, [f θ x] and for voiced stops [β ð ɣ]. /n l/ are also dentalized as [n̪ l̪].

=== Intonation ===
Difference between a question and a statement is marked with the tone, when there is no question word. Rising tone marks the question and falling tone the statement. Statements and questions with a question word are characterized by falling intonation at the end of the sentence.

Falling Intonation — Statement
Language	Example
Latin	(Á) wash ent
Perso-Arabic	(آ) وش اِنت
English	"(He/She) are well"

Falling Intonation — Question
Language	Example
Latin	(Taw) kojá raway?
Perso-Arabic	(تو) کجا رئوئے؟
English	"Where will (you) go?"

Questions without a question word are characterized by rising intonation at the end of the sentence.

Rising Intonation — Question
Language	Example
Latin	(Á) wash ent?
Perso-Arabic	(آ) وش اِنت؟
English	"Is (he/she) well?"

Both coordinate and subordinate clauses that precede the final clause in the sentence have rising intonation. The final clause in the sentence has falling intonation.

Rising Intonation — In clauses that precede the final clause
Language	Example
Latin	Shahray kuchah o damkán hechkas gendaga nabut o bázár angat band at
Perso-Arabic	شہر ئے کوچہ ءُ دمکان ھیچ کس گندگ ءَ نبوت ءُ بازار انگت بند اَت
English	"Nobody was seen in the streets of the town, and the marketplace was still closed"

== Grammar ==
The normal word order is subject–object–verb. Similar to many other Indo-Iranian languages, Balochi also features split ergativity. The subject is marked as nominative except for the past tense constructions where the subject of a transitive verb is marked as oblique and the verb agrees with the object. Balochi, similar to many Western Iranian languages, has lost the Old Iranian gender distinctions.

=== Numerals ===
Much of the Balochi number system is identical to Persian. Below are cardinal and ordinal numbers in Balochi:

Cardinal numerals
Balochi	Standard Alphabet (Balo-Rabi)	English
Yak	یک	One (Note: The latter ya is with nouns while yak is used by itself.)
Do	دو	Two
Say	سئے	Three
Chàr	چار	Four
Panch	پَانچ	Five
Shash	شش	Six
Hapt	ھپت	Seven
Hasht	ھشت	Eight
Noh	نہ	Nine
Dah	دہ	Ten

Ordinal numerals
Balochi	Standard Alphabet (Balo-Rabi)	English
Aoali	اولی	First
Domi	دومی	Second
Sayomi	سئیمی	Third
Cháromi	چارمی	Fourth
Panchomi	پانچمی	Fifth
Shashomi	ششمی	Sixth
Haptomi	ھپتمی	Seventh
Hashtomi	ھشتمی	Eighth
Nohmi	نہمی	Ninth
Dahomi	دہمی	Tenth
Goďďi	گُڈڈی	Last

== Dialects ==
=== Southern (Makrani) dialect ===
A speaker of Southern (Makrani) Balochi, for the Wikimedia Foundation's Wikitongues

The Makrani dialect is spoken in the southern parts of Balochistan (notably Makran), including coastal areas such as Gwadar, Pasni, Turbat, and Karachi. The dialect (despite the higher prevalence of the Rakshani) is also spoken in some coastal areas of the Sistan-Baluchestan province in cities such as: Qasr-e Qand, Nik Shahr, Rask, Chabahar, and Bandar Abbas.

There are two main sub-dialects: the dialect of the Mandwani (northern) tribes and the dialect of the Domki (southern) tribes. The dialectal differences are not very significant. One difference is that grammatical terminations in the northern dialect are less distinct compared with those in the southern tribes.

=== Eastern (Soleimani) dialect ===
A speaker of Eastern (Soleimani) Balochi, for the Wikimedia Foundation's Wikitongues

The Soleimani dialect is spoken mainly in eastern Balochistan, western Punjab, and parts of Sindh—all within Pakistan—particularly in areas such as Quetta, Kalat, Khuzdar, Lasbela, Chagai, Noshki, Dalbandin, Kharan, Mastung, the Kacchi Plains, Dera Ghazi Khan, Taunsa, Rajanpur, and Jacobabad.

While the Makrani and Rakshani dialects are close, the Soleimani dialect is often perceived as farther from the other two in terms of intelligibility. This is likely due to influence from languages such as Brahvi, Pashto, Sindhi, and Punjabi.

=== Western (Rakshani) dialect ===
The Rakshani dialect is predominantly spoken in western Balochistan, including parts of Iran and Afghanistan. Commonly spoken in the Sistan-Baluchestan province and Khorasan region within Iran. Various sub-dialects exist within the Rakshani dialect:

- Panjguri sub-dialect: spoken mainly within southern and southwestern areas of Afghanistan, around the Helmand River—however is also spoken in areas strecthing from the Kech River forming its southern border and the Rakhshan River
- Sarhadhi sub-dialect: Spoken in an area that extends from Dalbandin in Pakistan and from the northeast to Chahar Burjak in Afghanistan, and includes Merv in the Turkmenistan and Sistan in Iran, with Nosratabad in Iran, forming its southernmost part of extent.
- Saravani sub-dialect: Spoken mainly in Saravan and its surrounding areas, with Khash as its northern border and Espidan as its western border. In later works by Josef Elfenbein, Iranshahr, and Bampur are also considered to be within the Saravani dialect area.
- Lashari sub-dialect: centered on the village of Lashar, south of Iranshahr—featuring heavy influence from Persian.

=== Koroshi ===
An isolated dialect is Koroshi, which is spoken in the Qashqai tribal confederation in the Fars province. Koroshi distinguishes itself in grammar and lexicon among Balochi varieties.

== Writing system ==
Balochi was not a written language before the 19th century, and the Persian script was used to write Balochi wherever necessary. However, Balochi was still spoken within Baloch courts.

British colonial officers first wrote Balochi with the Latin script. Following the creation of Pakistan, Baloch scholars adopted the Persian alphabet. The first collection of poetry in Balochi, Gulbang by Mir Gul Khan Nasir, was published in 1951 and incorporated the Arabic script. It was much later that Syed Zahoor Shah Hashemi wrote a comprehensive guidance on the usage of Arabic script and standardized it as the Balochi orthography in Pakistan and Iran. This earned him the title of the "father of Balochi". His guidelines are widely used in eastern and western Balochistan. In Afghanistan, Balochi is still written in a modified Arabic script based on Persian.

In 2002, a conference in Quetta was held to help standardize the script that would be used for Balochi.

=== Old Balochi alphabet ===
The following alphabet was used by Syed Zahoor Shah Hashmi in his lexicon of Balochi Syed Ganj (سَیَد گنج; lit. Syed's Treasure). Until the creation of the Balochi Standard Alphabet, it was by far the most widely used alphabet for writing Balochi, and is still used very frequently.

ا، آ، ب، پ، ت، ٹ، ج، چ، د، ڈ، ر، ز، ژ، س، ش، ک، گ، ل، م، ن، و، ہ، ھ، ء، ی، ے

=== Standard Perso-Arabic alphabet ===
The Balochi Standard Alphabet, standardized by the Balochi Academy Sarbaz, consists of 29 letters. It is an extension of the Perso-Arabic script and borrows a few glyphs from Urdu. It is also sometimes referred to as Balo-Rabi or Balòrabi. Today, it is the preferred script to use in a professional setting and by the educated.

=== Latin alphabet ===
The following Latin-based alphabet was adopted by the International Workshop on "Balochi Roman Orthography" (University of Uppsala, Sweden, 28–30 May 2000).

==== Alphabetical order ====
a, á, b, c, d, ď, e, f, g, ĝ, h, i, í, j, k, l, m, n, o, p, q, r, ř, s, š, t, ť, u, ú, v, w, x, y, z, ž, ay, aw (33 letters and 2 digraphs)

Letter	IPA	Example words
A/a	[a]	asp (horse), garm (warm), mard (man)
Á/á	[aː]	áp (water), kár (work), as (fire)
B/b (bé)	[b]	barp (snow, ice), bám (dawn), bágpán (gardener), baktáwar (lucky)
Ch/ch (ché)	[tʃ]	chamm (eye), bacch (son), kárch (knife), marchi (today)
D/d (de)	[d]	dard (pain), drad (rainshower), pád (foot), wád (salt)
Dh/dh	[ɖ]	dhawl (shape), gwandh (short), chondh (piece)
E/e	[i]	esh (this), bale (but), late (some),
É/é	[eː]	éraht (harvest), bér (revenge), shér (lion) dér (late, delay), dém (face, front)
F/f (fe)	[f]	Only used for loanwords: fármaysí (pharmacy), fasl (crop), maf (forgive)
G/g (ge)	[ɡ]	gapp (talk), ganók (insane), bág (garden), bagg (herd of camels), pádag (feet), Bagdád (Baghdad)
Gh/gh	[ɣ]	Used for loanwords and in eastern dialects: ghair (others), ghali (carpet), ghaza (noise)
H/h (he)	[h]	hár (flood), máh (moon), kóh (mountain), mahár (rein), hón (blood)
I/i (i)	[iː]	imán (faith), shir (milk), pit (father), pakir (beggar), samin (breeze), gáli (carpet)
J/j (jé)	[dʒ]	jang (war), janag (to beat), jeng (lark), ganj (treasure), sajji (roasted meat)
K/k (ké)	[k]	Kermán (Kerman), kárch (knife), nákó (uncle), gwask (calf), kasán (small)
L/l (lé)	[l]	láp (stomach), gal (joy), gal (party, organization), goll (cheek), gol (rose)
M/m (mé)	[m]	mát (mother), bám (dawn), chamm (eye), master (elder)
N/n (né)	[n]	nagan (bread), nók (new, new moon), dhann (outside), kwahn (old), nákó (uncle)
O/o	[u]	oshter (camel), shomá (you all), ostád (teacher), gozhn (hunger), boz (goat)
Ó/ó (ó)	[oː]	óshtag (to stop), ózhnág (swim), róch (sun), dór (pain), sóchag (to burn)
P/p (pé)	[p]	pád (foot), shap (night), shapád (bare-footed), gapp (talk), haptád (seventy)
R/r (ré)	[ɾ]	rék (sand), barag (to take away), sharr (good), sarag (head)
Rh/rh (rhé)	[ɽ]	márhi (building), nájórh (sick)
S/s (sé)	[s]	sarag (head), kass (someone), kasán (little), bas (enough), ás (fire)
Sh/sh (shé)	[ʃ]	shap (night), shád (happy), mésh (sheep), shwánag (shepherd), wash (happy, tasty)
T/t (té)	[t]	tagerd (mat), tahná (alone), tás (bowl), kelitt (key)
Th/th (thé)	[ʈ]	thong (hole), thilló (bell), batth (cooked rice), batthág (eggplant)
U/u (u)	[uː]	zurag (to take), bezur (take), dur (distant), zurta (took)
W/w (wé)	[w]	warag (food), warden (provision), dawár (abode), wád (salt), kawwás (learned)
X/x (kh)	[x]	Used for loanwords: xuda (God), xar (donkey), taxt (bed, throne), xargoosh (bunny, rabbit)
Y/y (yé)	[j]	yád (remembrance), yár (friend), yázdah (eleven), beryáni (biryani), yak (one)
Z/z (zé)	[z]	zarr (money), zi (yesterday), mozz (wages), móz (banana), nazzíkk (nearby)
Zh/zh (zhé)	[ʒ]	zhand (tired), zháng (bells), pazhm (wool), gazzhag (to swell), gozhnag (hungry)
Latin digraphs
Ay/ay	[aj]	ayb (fault), say (three), kay (who)
Aw/aw	[aw]	awali (first), hor (rain), kawl (promise), gawk (neck)

==== Soviet alphabet ====
In 1933, the Soviet Union adopted a Latin-based alphabet for Balochi as follows:

Balochi alphabet in Latin
a	ə	ʙ	c	ç	d	ᶁ	e	f	g	h	i	j	k	ʟ
m	n	o	p	q	ʼ	r	s	t	ƫ	u	v	w	x	z	ƶ

The alphabet was used for several texts, including children's books, newspapers, and ideological works. In 1938, however, the official use of Balochi was discontinued.

=== Cyrillic alphabet ===
In 1989, Mammad Sherdil, a teacher from the Turkmen SSR, approached Balochi language researcher Sergei Axenov with the idea of creating a Cyrillic-based alphabet for Balochi. Before this, the Cyrillic script was already used for writing Balochi and was used in several publications but the alphabet was not standardized. In 1990, the alphabet was finished. It included the following letters:

Balochi alphabet in Cyrillic
а	а̄	б	в	г	ғ	д	д̨	е	ё	ж	җ	з	и	ӣ	й	к	қ	л	м	н
о	п	р	ꝑ	с	т	т̵	у	ӯ	ф	х	ц	ч	ш	щ	ъ	ы	ь	э	ю	я

The project was approved with some minor changes (қ, ꝑ, and ы were removed due to the rarity of these sounds in Balochi, and о̄ was added). From 1992 to 1993, several primary school textbooks were printed in this script. In the early 2000s, the script fell out of use.

== See also ==
=== Language ===
- Languages of Asia
  - Languages of Afghanistan
  - Languages of Pakistan
  - Languages of Iran

=== Study ===
- Pakistanology
- Iranology
  - Carina Jahani

== Bibliography ==
- Dames, Mansel Longworth (1922). A Text Book of the Balochi Language: Consisting of Miscellaneous Stories, Legends, Poems, and a Balochi-English Vocabulary. Lahore: Punjab Government Press.
- Farrell, Tim (1990). Basic Balochi: an introductory course. Naples: Università degli Studi di Napoli "L'Orientale". OCLC 40953807.
- Jahani, Carina; Korn, Agnes (2009). "Balochi". In Windfuhr, Gernot (ed.). The Iranian languages. Routledge Language Family Series (1st ed.). London: Routledge. pp. 634–692. ISBN 978-0-7007-1131-4.
- Serge, Axenov (2006). The Balochi language of Turkmenistan: a corpus based grammatical description. Stockholm: Uppsala Universitet. ISBN 978-91-554-6766-1. OCLC 82163314.
- Jahani, Carina; Korn, Agnes, eds. (2003). The Baloch and Their Neighbours: Ethnic and Linguistic Contact in Balochistan in Historical and Modern Times. In cooperation with Gunilla Gren-Eklund. Wiesbaden: Reichert. ISBN 978-3-89500-366-0. OCLC 55149070.
- Jahani, Carina, ed. (2000). Language in society: eight sociolinguistic essays on Balochi. Acta Universitatis Upsaliensis. Uppsala University. ISBN 978-91-554-4679-6. OCLC 44509598.
