= Davani (surname) =

Davani (Persian: دوانی) is a primarily Persian-language surname, although it is also found in Papua New Guinea. Notable people with the surname include:

- Alex Davani (born 1985), Papua New Guinean footballer
- Ali Davani (1929–2007), Iranian scholar
- Catherine Davani (1960–2016), Papua New Guinean judge
- Jalaladdin Davani (1462–1502), Iranian scholar
- Pirouz Davani, Iranian leftist activist
- Reggie Davani (born 1980), Papua New Guinean footballer
