= Abduyi dialect =

Northwestern Iranian language

Abduyi
- عبدویی
- Native to: Iran
- Native speakers: (undated figure of ca. 600)
- Language family: Indo-European: Indo-Iranian; Iranian; Western Iranian; Northwestern Iranian; Kurdish; (unclassified); Abduyi

Official status
- Regulated by: Academy of Persian Language and Literature

Language codes
- ISO 639-3: –
- Glottolog: None

The Abduyi dialect (Kurdish: عبدویی, UniPers: Abduyi) is a Northwestern Iranian language spoken in the village of Abdui, which can be reached from Kazerun city in Southern Iran via the old Shiraz-Kazerun road after 36 kilometers. The number of households in the village was approximately 120 in 2004. Most researchers identify the dialect as Kurdish.

== Phonology ==
The transcription used here is an approximation.

=== Vowels ===
short: â, a, e, i, o, u
long: â:, ā, ē, ī, ō, ū

=== Consonants ===
- voiced dental fricative: ð, a sound near to English voiced "th", generally after vowels, like in 'taðuk' (cockroach).
- palatal stops: front 'g' and 'k', like in 'kačče' (chin) and girib (cry).
- voiced velar fricative: γ, like in 'jeγarek' (hailstone).
- alveolar trill: like in 'borre' (flail).

== Grammar ==
=== Verbs ===
Infinitive markers: -san, -tan, -dan.

=== Nouns ===
Stresses on different vowels make nouns definite or indefinite. Example:
že (woman), tuhu (house).
Definite: žení (the woman), tevedí (the house).
Indefinite: žéni (a woman), tevédi (a house).

The plural is marked by the suffixes: -gal, -al, -u and -yu. Examples:
sib (apple) → sib-yu (apples)
morb (hen) → morb-u (hens)
âdam (person) → âdam-gal (persons)

== Vocabulary ==
English	Abduyi	Persian (Unipers)
beautiful	qašang	zibâ, qašang
blood	xin	xun
bread	nu	nân
bring	averdan	âvardan
brother	kâkâ	barâdar
come	ātan	âmadan
cry	gereyidan	geristan
dark	tarik	târik
daughter	dut	doxtar
day	ru	ruz
do	kerdan	kardan
door	der	dar
die	merdan	mordan
donkey	xar	xar
egg	xâg	toxme morgh
earth	zamin	zamin
eye	čām	čašm
father	bâvâ	pedar
fear	tars	tars
fiancé	numzad	nâmzad
fine	xoš	xoš
finger	penje	angošt
fire	teš, taš	âtaš, âzar
fish	mahi	mâhi
food / eat	γezâ/ xovârdan	ghezâ, xorâk / xordan
go	večedan	raftan
god	xodâ	xodâ
good	xub	xub
great	get	bozorg, gonde, gat
hand	das	dast

English	Abduyi	Persian (Unipers)
head	tel, ser	sar, kalle
heart	del	del, qalb
horse	asp	asb, astar
house	tuhu	xâne
language (Also Tongue)	zabun	zabân
laugh	xande kerdan	xandidan
man	merek	mard
moon	mâh	mâh
mother	dāni	mâdar, mâmân
mouth	kap	dahân
name	num	nâm
night	šô	šab
open	vâ kerdan	bâz kardan
peace	sōl	âshti, ârâmeš, ârâmi
place	je	jâ
read	xondan	xândan
say	gotan	goftan, gap zadan
scratch	kavarondan	xârândan
sister	xeva, dâdâ	xâhar
small	xordek	kucak, xord
son	pos	pesar, pur, bacce
tall	derâz	boland, bârez, derâz
three	se	se
water	ô	âb, ow
weave	bâftan	bâftan
when	kay	key
wind	bâ	bâd
woman	že, ži	zan
yesterday	dede	diruz

== Example sentences ==
English	Abduyi	Persian	Unipers
What is this?	hena če-na?	این چیست؟	In cist?
Where is Ali?	ali keve-ye?	علی کجاست؟	Ali kojâst?
This horse is white.	he aspa safid-e.	.این اسب سفید است	In asb sefid ast.
They say he works ten hours a day.	temš-an ke reš-i dā sâa't kâr tekâ-t.	.میگویند روزی ده ساعت کار میکند	Miguyand ruzi dah sâat kâr mikonad.
I have two small brothers and sisters.	dotto kâkâ ō dotto dâdâ-m hasta.	.دو برادر و خواهر کوچک دارم	Do barâdar va xâhare kucak dâram.
If you will go just once to their village, you won't forget the hospitality of its people.	ege faqat e kaše e deh-e evo večede pe hič vaxt mehmun-dâri-ye mardoman a eš yâdo-t vi neyčut.	.اگر تنها یکبار به ده آنها رفته باشی، مهمان‌نوازی مردم آنجا را هرگز از یاد نخواهی برد	Agar tanhâ yekbâr be dehe ânhâ rafte bâši, mehmânnavâziye mardome ânjâ râ hargez az yâd naxâhid bord.
Who called me?	ke heyâ may ke?	چه کسی مرا صدا زد؟	Cekasi marâ sedâ zad?

== See also ==
- Dialects of Fars
- Persian dialects and varieties
- Northwestern Iranian languages
- Iranian languages
