= Koroshi dialect =

Balochi dialect of Iran

Koroshi
- کورۏشی
- Native to: Iran
- Native speakers: 1000 (2006)
- Language family: Indo-European: Indo-Iranian; Iranian; Western Iranian; Northwestern; Balochi; Western–Southern Balochi; Southern–Koroshi Balochi; Koroshi
- Writing system: Persian alphabet

Official status
- Regulated by: Academy of Persian Language and Literature

Language codes
- ISO 639-3: ktl
- Glottolog: koro1296
- ELP: Koroshi

Koroshi (Koroshi: کوروشی, Balochi: کورۏشی) is a Balochi dialect. The Baloch speakers of Koroshi live in scattered pockets in Southern Iranian Fars province. The number of speakers was estimated to be 1,000 in 2006. According to Ethnologue the dialect has 180 speakers within 40 to 50 families.

Entirely isolated from the main body of the Baloch habitat, Koroshi distinguishes itself in grammar and lexicon among Balochi varieties.

Glottolog divides the Koroshi into two categories: Coastal Koroshi and Inland Koroshi.

== Phonology ==
The transcription used here is only an approximation:

=== Vowels ===
- short: â, a, e, i, o, u
- long: â:, ā, ē, ī, ō, ū

=== Consonants ===
- voiced dental fricative: ð, like in 'sað' (hundred).
- voiced velar fricative: ɣ, like in 'maɣz' (copula).
- alveolar trill: like in 'arra' (saw, the hand tool).
- palatal: 'g' and 'k', like in 'heykal' (body) and 'merzeng' (eyelash).

== Grammar ==
=== Verbs ===
- Infinitive markers: -ag ('g' is palatal here).

=== Nouns ===
- The suffixes "-yok" and "-â" make nouns definite. Examples:

golâbi (pear) → golâbi-yok (the pear)
bâmard (man) → bâmard-â (the man)

- The indefinite marker is "i". Example:

čok (child) → čokk-i (a child)

- The plural is marked by the suffixes "-gal" and "obâr" . Examples:

mardin (man) → mardin-gal (men)
sib (apple) → sib-obâr (apples)

- Adjectives are placed before nouns. Examples:

siyâhayn angur (black grape)
qašanguveyn pirâhâm (beautiful shirt)

== Vocabulary ==
English	Koroshi	Balochi	Persian (Unipers)
beautiful	qašang	sharr, soherâ	zibâ, xoščehre, qašang
blood	hun	Hòn ھۏن	xun
bread	nagan	nagan, nàn	nân
bring	ârag	àrag	âvardan
brother	berâd	bràt, bràs	barâdar
come	akkag	á ag	âmadan
cry	girrag	grèwag	geriyeh
dark	târik	tahàr	târik
daughter	jānek	menď, janek	doxtar
day	roč	ròc	ruz
do	kanag	kanag	kardan
door	dar	gelo, dar, darwàzag	dar
die	merag	merag	mordan
donkey	kar	har	xar
egg	heyx	haik/hayk	toxme morq
earth	dogâr	zomin, ďagàr	zamin, zemin
eye	čām	čham, čamm	čašm
father	bovâ(y)	pet, pes	pedar, bâbâ
fear	tors	tors	tars
fiancé	numzâð	deštàr/ještàr	nâmzad
fine	xoš, xâš	waš	xoš
finger	pinja	lankotk, mòrdànag	angošt
fire	âs	âč, âs	âtaš, âzar
fish	mâhin	màhig	mâhi
food / eat	xorâk / varag	warag, varàk	qazâ, xorâk / xordan
four	čâr	càr	čahâr, čâr
go	ravag	rawag	raftan
god	xoðâ	hodà, hàwand	xodâ
good	xūb	jowàn,šarr, geh	xub
great	čoqqor	master	bozorg, gonde, gat
hand	das	dast	dast

English	Koroshi	Balochi	Persian (Unipers)
head	sar, kalla	sar	sar, kalle
heart	del	dil, hatyr, zerd	del, dil
horse	asp	asp	asb, astar
house	log	log, gis	xâne
language (Also Tongue)	zebân	zevân, zobân	zabân
laugh	kannag	khendeg, hendeg, kandag	xandidan
man	mardin, bâmard	merdin	mard
moon	mā	máh	mâh
mother	doyi	mât, mâs	mâdar, mâmân
mouth	daf	dap, daf	dahân
name	num	num	nâm
night	šaf	shaw, šap	šab
open	vâz kanag	pač kanag	vâkardan, bâz kardan
peace	sōl	ârâm	âshti, ârâmeš, ârâmi, solh
place	jâ	hend, jâ	jâ
read	vânag	wánag	xândan
say	gašag	gushag	goftan, gap zadan
scratch	karânag	kičaenag	xârândan
sister	gâhâr, daða	gwhâr	xâhar
small	kassân, kam	lekem, kassân	kucak, kam, xord
son	bač	pisar, phussag, bač	pesar, pur, bacce
tall	bolan	bwrz	boland, bârez, derâz, borz
three	sa	se	se
water	âf	âf, âp	âb, ow
weave	gâfag	gwapag	bâftan
when	kad	ked	key
wind	gâd	gwáth	bâd
woman	jan	jan	zan
yesterday	zi	zí	diruz, di

== Example sentences ==
English	Koroshi	Balochi	Persian
What is this?	i či-yen?	اے چی‌ئے؟	این چیست؟ / en či-ye?
Where is Ali?	ali ko-yen?	ئَلی کۏ اِنت؟/ئلی کجا اِنت؟	علی کجاست؟ - ali ku?
This horse is white.	i asp esbiyeð-en.	ای سُپݔتݔن/اِسپݔتݔن اسپ اِنتٚ	.این اسب سفید است - en/in asb sefid-e
They say he works ten hours a day.	maya šey-ant rōč-i dah sâat kâr makan-a.	آ گُش اَنت رۏچے دہ ساھَت کارءَ کَنت	.میگویند روزی ده ساعت کار میکند - ânhâ migan, ke ū(n) dah soat dar rūz kar mikonê.
I have two small brothers and sisters.	do tâ kâkâ(berâd) vo gâhâr-e kassân assen-om.	منا دو كسانݔن برات ءُ گوٚھار ھہ۔	.دو برادر و خواهر کوچک دارم - do tâ doxtar va baradâr daram
If you will go just once to their village, you won't forget the hospitality of its people.	aga faqat ya dafâ ba âšâni dâhâ rafayado âšâni mehmândâriyâ hič vaxt yâdo anaraft.	اگہ تؤ یک برے آ مردمانء جاھا بہ روئ ھچبر آیانء مھمانداری‌ئا نہ شمۏش اݔت؟	.اگر تنها یکبار به ده آنها رفته باشی، مهمان‌نوازی مردم آنجا را هرگز از یاد نخواهی برد - agar faqat ye(k) bar be deh e ishân beri, tu mehmânnvaziye mardom o yâdet nemirê.
Who called me?	kayad manâ ganki jad?	کئ‌ئا منا گوانک جَت؟	چه کسی مرا صدا زد؟ - ki manô sedâ kard?

== See also ==
- Dialects of Fars
- Northwestern Iranian languages
- Iranian languages
