= Qadi Husayn Maybudi =

Muslim philosopher

Qadi Kamal al-Din Qadi Husayn Maybudi
- قادی حسین میبدی
- Born: 1449; Maybud, Timurid Empire (present-day Iran)
- Died: 1504 (aged ~55); Maybud, Safavid Iran
- Occupations: Scholar, Islamic judge (Qadi), philosopher
- Children: at least one son, Mirza Abd al-Rashid al-Munajjim
- Father: Khwaja Mu'in al-Din Ali

Academic background
- Influences: Jalal al-Din Davani

Academic work
- Era: Late 15th century-early 16th century
- School or tradition: Sha'i jurisprudence (legal school)
- Main interests: Philosophy, Islamic jurisprudence, Quranic commentary, poetry
- Notable works: Sharh al-Hidayah (commentary on Athir al-Din al-Abhari); Sharh-i Divan-i Ali ibn Abi Talib; Munshaʿat; Jam-i giti-numa; Sharh al-Kafiyah fi al-Nahw; Kashf al-asrār wa‘uddat al-abrār (a ten-volume Persian commentary on the Qur’an)

Qadi Kamal al-Din Husayn ibn Mu'in al-Din Ali Maybudi (Persian: قادی کمال الدین حسین بن معین الدین علی میبدی), better known as Qadi Husayn Maybudi (قادی حسین میبدی), was an Iranian scholar and qadi (judge) in the city of Yazd under the Aq Qoyunlu. He was executed in 1504 after having participated in a failed revolt against the Safavid shah (king) Ismail I (r. 1501–1524).

== Biography ==
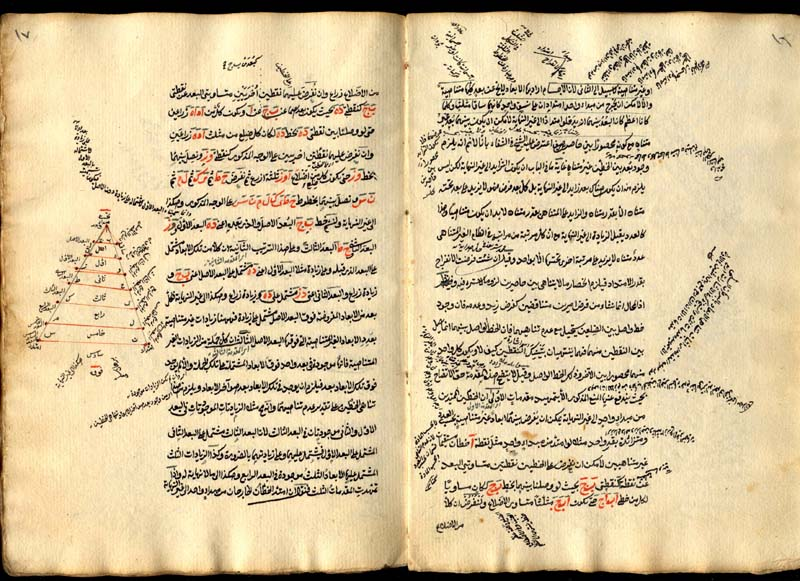
A 1648 manuscript copy of one of the works of Maybudi

Born in 1449, Maybudi was presumably a native of the city of Maybud in southern Iran, rather than the neighbouring city of Yazd. The area was then part of the Timurid Empire. He belonged to an affluent and influential family of aristocratic origin. He was the son of Khwaja Mu'in al-Din Ali, a prominent philanthropist and vizier of Yazd. At a young age, Maybudi left for Shiraz to study under prominent scholars such as Jalal al-Din Davani (died 1503). He was executed in 1504 after having participated in a failed revolt against the Safavid shah (king) Ismail I (r. 1501–1524). He was survived by at least one of his sons, Mirza Abd al-Rashid al-Munajjim.

== His works ==
1. Sharh al-hidayah (famous commentary on Athir al-Din al-Abhari, cf. Browne IV, p. 57: "Maybodi's commentary . . . is still the favourite text-book for beginners in philosophy . . .")
2. Sharh-i Divan-i Ali ibn Abi Talib (Commentary on the poem of Ali ibn Abi Talib). The book has been published by Miras-i Maktub; Chap-i 1 edition (2000), Published in 1998, ISBN 978-964-6781-39-9, ISBN 9789645548634
3. Munsha'at ISBN 964-5548-63-2
4. Jam-i giti-numa
5. Sharh al-Kafiyah fi al-Nahw
6. Kashf al-asrār waʿuddat al-abrār (The Unveiling of the Secrets and the Provisions of the Righteous), a ten-volume Persian commentary on the Quran

== Sources ==
- Dunietz, Alexandra (2015). The Cosmic Perils of Qadi Ḥusayn Maybudī in Fifteenth-Century Iran. Brill. ISBN 978-9004302310.
- Dunietz, Alexandra (2020). "Maybudī, Qāḍī Mīr Ḥusayn". In Fleet, Kate; Krämer, Gudrun; Matringe, Denis; Nawas, John; Rowson, Everett (eds.). Encyclopaedia of Islam (3rd ed.). Brill Online. ISSN 1873-9830.
- Pourjavady, Reza (2011). Philosophy in Early Safavid Iran. Brill. ISBN 978-9004191730.
