= Korouni dialect =

Southern Kurdish dialect of Iran

Korouni
- کرونی
- Native to: Iran
- Language family: Indo-European: Indo-Iranian; Iranian; Western; Northwestern; Kurdish; Southern; Korouni

Official status
- Regulated by: Academy of Persian Language and Literature

Language codes
- ISO 639-3: –
- Glottolog: None

Korouni (Kurdish: کرونی) is a Southern Kurdish dialect of Fars and Kurdistan. Koruni is a Kurdish tribe of Kurdistan and Fars. Most of the tribe was transplanted from Kurdistan to Fars by Karim Khan Zand during the 1760s.

The speakers of Korouni live in scattered pockets in Southern Iranian Fars province around Shiraz, Sepidan and Kazerun. The succeeding information is about the dialect spoken around the latter two cities.

== See also ==
- Kuruni (tribe)
- Koruni, Shiraz
- Dialects of Fars
- Northwestern Iranian languages
- Iranian languages
