= Koruni, Shiraz =

Koruni كروني
- Village
- Location within Iran
- Coordinates: 29°32′14″N 52°29′55″E
- Country: Iran
- Province: Fars
- County: Shiraz
- Bakhsh: Central
- Rural District: Qarah Bagh

Population (2006)
  - Total: 2,037
- Time zone: UTC+3:30 (IRST)
  - Summer (DST): UTC+4:30 (IRDT)

Koruni (Persian: كروني, also Romanized as Korūnī) is a village in Qarah Bagh Rural District, in the Central District of Shiraz County, Fars province, Iran. At the 2006 census, its population was 2,037, in 525 families.

== See also ==
- Kuruni (tribe)
- Korouni dialect
