= Ali Davani =

Iranian cleric (1929–2007)

- Born: 27 September 1929; Davan, Imperial State of Iran
- Died: 8 January 2007 (aged 77)
- Resting place: Fatima Masumeh Shrine
- Occupations: Anthropologist; historian

Ali Davani or Ali Davāni (Persian: علی دوانی; 27 September 1929 – 8 January 2007) was an Iranian scholar and researcher, working in the fields of anthropology, bibliography, and history.

== Early life and education ==
Davāni was born on 27 September 1929 in Davan, a village located north of Kazerun. He left his village for Abadan aged six. He went to the holy city of Najaf when he was 14 and returned to his birthplace after five years of study. He went to Qom to complete his education in 1949 after his marriage. He was subsequently granted the super ordinate rank of Allāmeh Tabātabā'i, Ayatollah Borujerdi and Imam Khomeini in Qom too.

== Activities ==
As well as scholarship, Davāni was involved in establishing the scientific and religious magazine of Maktab-e Islam, and writing Ayatollah Vahid Behbahāni's biography, on the encouragement of Ayatollah Borujerdi. He also translated the 13th Volume of Behār-ul Anvār into Persian about Imam Mahdi.

In 1971, following some disputes that led to his colleagues at Maktab-e Islam magazine leaving Qom, Davāni moved from Qom to Tehran, to continue his mission as an "inheritor of the prophets".

Davāni died on 8 January 2007.
