= Dialects of Fars =

Persian dialect in the Fars province of Iran

Dialects of Fars are a group of Southwestern Iranian dialects spoken in the central Fars province. The southwestern dialects can be divided into three families of dialects according to geographical distribution and local names: Southwestern (Lori), South-central (Kuhmareyi) and Southeastern (Larestani). Under linguistic typology a part of the dialects of the region can be classified as follows:

Southwestern		Northwestern
Nominative–accusative	Split-Ergative in past transitive constructions	
Tajiki Kalani, Lori Kalani, Mamassani Lori, Basseri, Balyani, Hayati (Dowlat Abadi), Lordarengani, Dezhgahi/Gowri, Richi, Tang Kishi, Zakhoruyei	Kuhmareyi: Davani, Dahlei, Kandeyi, Kuzargi, Masarmi, Birovakani, Dadenjani, Dorounaki/Mehboudi, Banafi, Papuni, Dusirani, Somghani, Gorganayi-Gavkoshaki, Mosqani, Nudani; Larestani: Asiri, Aheli, Khonji, Gerrashi/Zeynal Abadi, Kalati (Evaz), Kariyani; Others: Shurabi	Koroshi, Sivandi, Abduyi, Korouni

And the extinct old Kazeruni and Old Shirazi (Sherazi) dialects. This group of dialects is not to be confused with the standard Persian, the official language of Iran; and they are not restricted to the present border of Fars province.

== Example ==
Language/ Dialect	Sentence
English	Everyone who saw me greeted me.
Persian	har ki mano did, be man salâm kard
Korouni	har ka me-ni di, va me salâm kerd
Tajiki Kalani	har k̂i may di, salâm ike
Lori Kalani	har ka mo midi, salâm ike
Mamassani Lori	har k̂e me na di, vam salâm k̂e
Basseri	har ke me-ye di, salâm-om ke
Balyani	har k̂e mo di, salâm-am ke
Hayati(Dowlat Abadi)	har k̂i mo-na dið, salâm-om kerd
Lordarengani	har k̂i mo-na dið, az mo salâm kerd
Dezhgahi/Gowri	har k̂a mo dið, salam kerd
Richi	har k̂e mo-na di, salâm-am k̂-e
Tang Kishi	har ke mo miði, salâm-am mik̂e
Zakhoruyei	har ke mo dið, salâm-om k̂erd

Language/ Dialect	Sentence
Davani	har k̂i-š ma di-š, salâm k̂e
Dahlei	har k̂iš ma di, eš salâm ama k̂e
Kandeyi	har k̂i om dið-eyi, salâm kârd-ey
Kuzargi	har k̂i me-š di, salâm oš k̂e
Masarmi	har k̂a me eš- di, salâm-ša k̂erda
Birovakani	har k̂i seyl-em eš ki, salâm-eš ki
Dadenjani	har k̂i ma-š di, salâm-eš ki
Dorounaki/ Mehboudi	har k̂i ke ma-š di, salâm-eš ke
Banafi	har k̂i eš ma di eš, salâm-am k̂e
Papuni	har k̂i mo-š di, salâm-eš k̂e
Dusirani	har k̂i mo oš di, salâm-oš a mo k̂e
Somghani	har k̂i mo-š di, salâm-eš k̂e
Gorganayi-Gavkoshaki	har k̂e-â midim, salâm na-šk̂e
Mosqani	har k̂e ma eš di, salâm-eš k̂e

Language/ Dialect	Sentence
Asiri	har ke mo-š di, salâm-om oš-ke
Aheli	har ke mo-š di, salâm-om oš-ke
Khonji	har ka mo-š di, salâm-oš kerd-om
Gerrashi/ Zeynal Abadi	har ke mo-š di, salâm-e mo-š ke
Kalati (Evaz)	har-ka-š ded-om, salâm-oš kerd-om
Kariyani	har ke mo-š di, salâm-oš ke
Shurabi	har ke me oš-di, salâm-eš ke
Koroshi	har k̂a man-a didi, ba man salâm iko
Sivandi	har kâmišâ merâ diyešâ avinim wâtešâ salâm
Abduyi	har k̂asi k̂e may di, selâm-i k̂e
