= Jalal al-Din Davani =

Iranian philosopher (1426/7–1502)

- Born: 1426/7; Davan, Fars, Timurid Empire
- Died: October/November 1502 (aged 75/76); Fars, Aq Qoyunlu
- Occupation: Scholar
- Father: Sa'd al-Din As'ad

Jalal al-Din al-Dawani (Note: Also spelled Dawani. His name is also sometimes spell erroneously as Dawwani.) (Persian: جلال الدین دوانی; 1426/7 – 1502), also known as Allama Davani (علامه دوانی), was a theologian, philosopher, jurist, and poet, who is considered to have been one of the leading scholars in late 15th-century Iran.

A native of the town of Davan in the southern Iranian region of Fars, Davani completed his education at the provincial capital of Shiraz, where he started to distinguish himself. In the 1460s, he briefly served as the sadr (chief of religious affairs) of the Qara Qoyunlu governor of Fars, Mirza Yusuf, and accompanied the latter's father Jahan Shah (r. 1438–1467) in his battle against the Aq Qoyunlu ruler Uzun Hasan (r. 1453–1478), where the latter emerged victorious. Initially taking refuge and distancing himself from the Aq Qoyunlu, Davani soon entered their service, being appointed as qadi (chief judge) of Fars by Uzun Hasan's son and successor, Ya'qub Beg (r. 1478–1490).

Davani was also in contact with figures outside Iran, such as the Ottoman sultan Bayezid II (r. 1481–1512) and the rulers in India, whom he dedicated several of his works to, especially during Ya'qub Beg's reign. With the constant flow of gifts that Davani was receiving from his patrons, he eventually became rich. However, all of his belongings were soon confiscated in 1498 or 1499 by the Aq Qoyunlu ruler of Fars, Qasim-Bay Purnak. Davani afterwards spent much of his time in various small cities south of Shiraz, such as Jirun (Hormuz) and Lar. He died in October/November 1502, and was buried in his hometown.

== Background and education ==
An ethnic Persian, Davani was born in the town of Davan, near Shiraz, the capital city of the southern Iranian region of Fars, which was then under Timurid rule. He was the eldest son of Sa'd al-Din As'ad, a qadi (chief judge) of the district of Kazarun, which Davan was attached to. His family claimed descent from the first Rashidun caliph Abu Bakr (r. 632–634), and thus Davani was sometimes known by the epithet of al-Siddiqi. Davani initially studied under his father, until he left for Shiraz to continue his education, where he studied under Mawlana Muhyi al-Din Gusha Kinari, Mawlana Humam al-Din Gulbari and Safi al-Din Ijil. There he stood out amongst his peers, which started to draw the attention of students far away. Davani wrote his first work on 25 May 1449, which was a commentary on the Tafsir al-Baydawi of the Persian scholar Qadi Baydawi (died 1319). In 1451, the Turkmen Qara Qoyunlu took advantage of the death of the Timurid ruler of Persian Iraq and Fars, Sultan Muhammad, conquering the regions in 1452 and 1453, respectively.

== Rise and service under the Qara Qoyunlu and Aq Qoyunlu ==
By the time Davani had reached his thirties, his reputation as a religious scholar had already been established. He briefly served as the sadr (chief of religious affairs) of the Qara Qoyunlu governor of Fars, Mirza Yusuf, but soon resigned. It is unknown why he resigned from his post; regardless, Davani still retained a close relationship with Mirza Yusuf's father, sultan Jahan Shah (r. 1438–1467). He accompanied the latter in his battle against the Aq Qoyunlu ruler Uzun Hasan (r. 1453–1478), which took place on the field of Mush in Diyar Bakr in on 10 or 11 November 1467. Jahan Shah's forces were defeated, and he was himself killed. Davani fled to the city of Tabriz in the northwestern Iranian region of Azerbaijan, losing some of his books in the process.

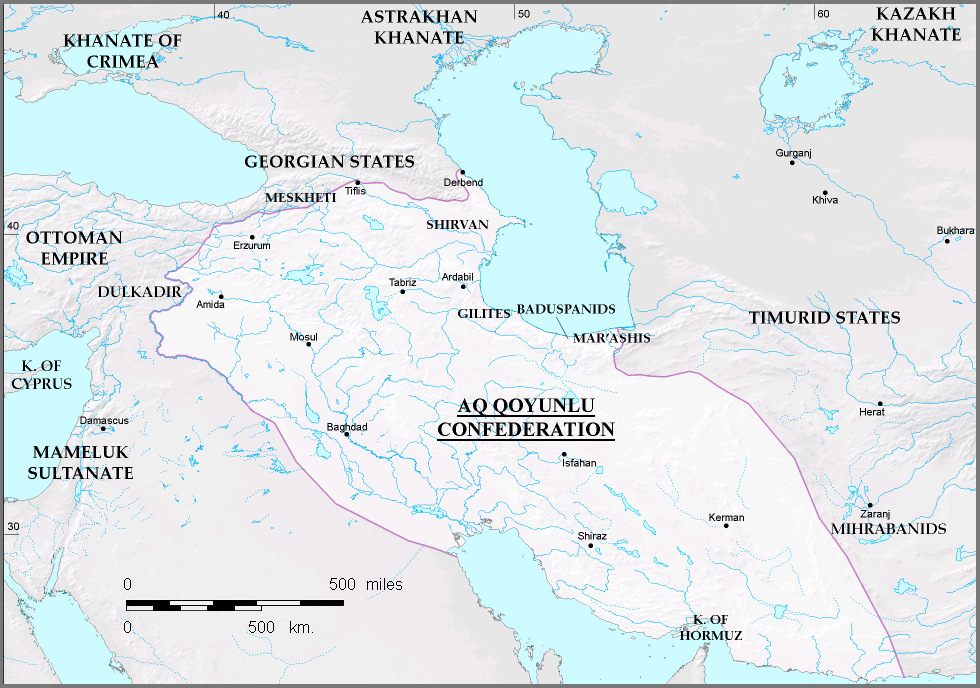
Map of the Aq Qoyunlu realm under Uzun Hasan (r. 1453–1478) in 1478

There he stayed for a while, composing the Shawakil al-hur fi sharh Hayakil al-nur a commentary on the Hayakil al-Nur, a work by the 12th-century Persian philosopher Suhrawardi (died 1191). The commentary is dedicated to Mahmud Gawan (died 1481), the Persian vizier of the Bahmanid sultan of the Deccan, Muhammad Shah III Lashkari (r. 1463–1482). Some years later, Davani returned to Shiraz and became the mudarris (teacher) of the Begum Madrasa (later known as Dar al-Aytam). It was that there he established a relation with the Aq Qoyunlu, especially with Uzun Hasan's son Sultan Khalil, who governed Fars. In 1474, Davani dedicated ethical work Lawami' al-ishraq fi makarim al-akhlaq (also known as Akhlaq-i Jalili) to Uzun Hasan and Khalil. In this work, he described Uzun Hasan as "the shadow of God, the caliph of God, and the deputy of the Prophet". In September/October 1476, Davani wrote an eyewitness report of a military parade by Khalil at the ruins of ancient Achaemenid city of Persepolis. He credited the mythological Iranian king Jamshid as the founder of the city, and associated him with Solomon, a common association in Iranian literary traditions.

During Khalil's brief rule in 1478, Davani dedicated another of his works to him; an explanation of Ali Qushji's (died 1474) commentary on the Tajrid al-i'itiqad by the 13th-century Persian scholar Nasir al-Din Tusi. Following Khalil's premature death in August 1478, his brother Ya'qub Beg (r. 1478–1490) succeeded him, and appointed Davani as the qadi of Fars. Davani also accepted Ya'qub's invitation to the court in Tabriz. However, Davani opposed the later centralization reforms of Ya'qub, and thus their relations worsened. Together with Abu-Yazid al-Davani and Maulana Muhammad al-Muhyavi, Davani sent letters to Ya'qub's vizier Qazi Isa Savaji to protest these reforms.

During Ya'qub's reign, most of Davani's work was dedicated to figures outside Iran. A close friend of the Ottoman sultan Bayezid II (r. 1481–1512), Mu'ayyadzade Abd al-Rahman Efendi (died 1516), arrived to Shiraz in 1479, where he studied under Davani until 1483. It was through Mu'ayyadzade that Davani established a network with Bayezid II. Davani dedicated three of his works to the latter; the Sharh al-Ruba'iyyat, Risalat Ithbat al-wajib al-qadima, and al-Hashiya al-jadida. As a gratitude for his Risalat Ithbat al-wajib al-qadima, Bayezid II gifted Davani 500 florins. The Ottoman ulama (clergy) also praised his work. Davani dedicated his Unmudhaj al-ulum and Tahqiq-i adalat to the sultan of the Gujarat Sultanate, Mahmud Begada (r. 1458–1511), and was in return rewarded 1000 dirhams.

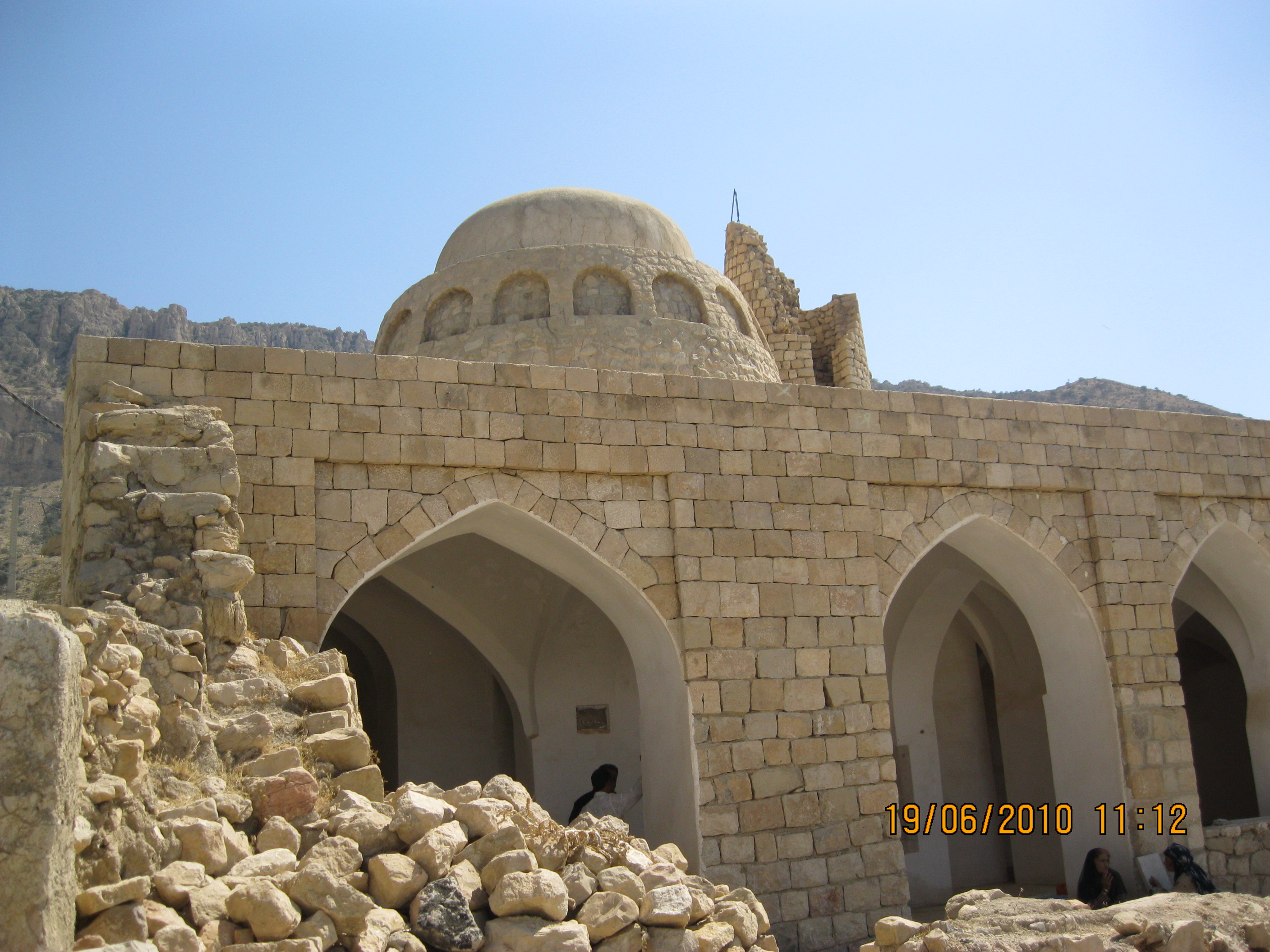
Mausoleum of Jalal al-Din Davani in his hometown of Davan

With the constant flow of gifts that Davani was receiving from his patrons, he eventually became rich. However, all of his belongings were soon confiscated in 1498 or 1499 by the Aq Qoyunlu ruler of Fars, Qasim-Bay Purnak. Davani afterwards spent much of his time in various small cities south of Shiraz. Some sources report that Davani planned to accept the invitation of the Samma sultan Nizam al-Din Shah Sindhi (r. 1461–1508) and leave for India. Two of Davani's students, Mir Shams al-Din Muhammad al-Jurjani (a great-grandson of the prominent al-Sharif al-Jurjani), and Mir Mu'in al-Din, were already present at Nizam al-Din's court. This may explain why Davani went to Jirun (Hormuz), an island in the Persian Gulf. Davani also went to the city of Lar, where he completed his Risalat Ithbat al-wajib al-qadima and Diwan-i Mazalim.

Davani reportedly disapproved the messianic claims of the Safavid shah (king) Ismail I (r. 1501–1524), who had captured the Aq Qoyunlu capital of Tabriz in 1501. Regardless, it is presumed that Davani's undated work Nur al-hidaya was written during this period, in which Davani espoused pro-Shi'ism, probably in hope of appeasing the Shia Safavids. Davani died soon after, in the month of October or November in 1502. He was buried in a mausoleum named Bogh'a-ye Shaykh-e Ali in his hometown of Davan. Approximately two years later (in 1504), Shiraz was captured by Ismail I, who had the Sunni clerics who were unwilling to convert to Shi'ism executed.

== Legacy ==
Davani is considered to have been one of the leading scholars in late 15th-century Iran. The modern historian John E. Woods calls him the "ideological mainstay of the Aq Qoyunlu Empire in Uzun Hasan's time." Several prominent figures studied under Davani, such as Qadi Husayn Maybudi (died 1504); qadi of Yazd; Jamal al-Din Hosayn Mohammad Astarabadi (died 1525), sadr under Ismail I's son and successor shah Tahmasp I (r. 1524–1576); and Qadi Jahan Qazvini, vizier under Tahmasp I.

== Sources ==
- Binbaş, İlker Evrim (2016), Intellectual Networks in Timurid Iran: Sharaf al-Dīn 'Alī Yazdī and the Islamicate Republic of Letters, Cambridge University Press, ISBN 978-1-107-05424-0
- Browne, Edward G. (2013). A History of Persian Literature under Tartar Dominion (A.D, 1265-1502). Cambridge University Press. ISBN 978-1110767601.
- Dunietz, Alexandra (2015). The Cosmic Perils of Qadi Ḥusayn Maybudī in Fifteenth-Century Iran. Brill. ISBN 978-9004302310.
- Dunietz, Alexandra (2020). "Maybudī, Qāḍī Mīr Ḥusayn". In Fleet, Kate; Krämer, Gudrun; Matringe, Denis; Nawas, John; Rowson, Everett (eds.). Encyclopaedia of Islam (3rd ed.). Brill Online. ISSN 1873-9830.
- Lambton, A.K.S. (1965). "al-Dawānī". In Lewis, B.; Pellat, Ch. & Schacht, J. (eds.). The Encyclopaedia of Islam, Second Edition. Volume II: C–G. Leiden: E. J. Brill. OCLC 495469475.
- Langaroodi, Reza Rezazadeh; Negahban, Farzin (2015). "Āq-qūyūnlū". In Madelung, Wilferd; Daftary, Farhad (eds.). Encyclopaedia Islamica Online. Brill Online. ISSN 1875-9831.
- Minorsky, Vladimir (1955). "The Aq-qoyunlu and Land Reforms". Bulletin of the School of Oriental and African Studies. 17 (3): 449–462. doi:10.1017/S0041977X00112376. JSTOR 609589. S2CID 154166838. (registration required)
- Mitchell, Colin P. (2009). The Practice of Politics in Safavid Iran: Power, Religion and Rhetoric. I.B.Tauris. pp. 1–304. ISBN 978-0857715883.
- Newman, Andrew J. (1994). "Davānī, Jalāl-al-Dīn Davānī". In Yarshater, Ehsan (ed.). Encyclopædia Iranica. Vol. VII/2: Dastūr al-Afāżel–Dehqān I. London and New York: Routledge & Kegan Paul. pp. 132–133. ISBN 978-1-56859-020-2.
- Newman, Andrew J. (2008). Safavid Iran: Rebirth of a Persian Empire. I.B.Tauris. pp. 1–296. ISBN 978-0857716613.
- Pourjavady, Reza (2011). Philosophy in Early Safavid Iran. Brill. ISBN 978-9004191730.
- Savory, Roger M. (1964). "The Struggle for Supremacy in Persia after the death of Tīmūr". Jahresband. 40. De Gruyter: 35–65. doi:10.1515/islm.1964.40.1.35. S2CID 162340735.
- Savory, Roger M.; Karamustafa, Ahmet T. (1998). "Esmāʿīl Ṣafawī". Encyclopædia Iranica, online edition, Vol. III, Fasc. 5. New York. pp. 514–522.
- Woods, John E. (1999). The Aqquyunlu: Clan, Confederation, Empire (Revised and Expanded ed.). University of Utah Press. ISBN 978-0874805659.
