= Kuruni (tribe) =

Kurdish tribe in Fars province, Iran

Kuruni (Persian: کرونی) is a Kurdish tribe in Fars province, southern Iran. Most of the tribe was transplanted to the Shiraz area by Karim Khan Zand when he moved to the area during the 1760s. The tribe is originally from the Kermanshah area.

== History ==
After the end of the Zand dynasty, the tribe was forcefully moved by Agha Mohammad Khan Qajar and joined the Kashkollu Qashqai tribal confederacy, gradually becoming Turcophone and Shia. By the beginning of the 1900s, parts of the tribe moved to the Beyza valley northwest of Shiraz, while others moved to Shiraz city and founded the neighborhood of Koruni. For this reason, there are three Kuruni groups in around Shiraz. 150 Kuruni members were still part of the Qashqai in the 1950s. When the central government began their anti-Qashqai policies in the 1960s, the tribe left the Qashqai confederation and reasserted their Kuruni identity.

== See also ==
- Korouni dialect
- Koruni, Shiraz

== Bibliography ==
- Beck, Lois (1990), Khoury, Philip S.; Kostiner, Joseph (eds.), Tribes and the State in Nineteenth- and Twentieth-Century Iran, University of California Press
- Oberling, Pierre (2004a), "Kuruni", Encyclopedia Iranica
- Oberling, Pierre (2004b), "KAŠKULI BOZORG", Encyclopedia Iranica, XVI
- Potts, D. T. (2014), Nomadism in Iran: From Antiquity to the Modern Era, Oxford University Press
