= Eastern Balochi dialects =

Dialect of the western Iranian language

Eastern Balochi
- سلئیمانی بلۏچی
- Native to: Pakistan, Iran Afghanistan, Turkmenistan
- Region: Balochistan
- Language family: Indo-European: Indo-Iranian; Iranian; Western Iranian; Northwestern; Balochi; Eastern Balochi
- Dialects: Sulaimani; Eastern Hill Balochi
- Writing system: Balochi Alphabet

Language codes
- ISO 639-2: bgp
- ISO 639-3: bgp – inclusive code Individual code: bgp – Eastern Balochi
- Glottolog: east2304
- Linguasphere: (East Balochi) 58-AAB-aa (East Balochi)

Eastern Balochi (Note: Balochi: سلئیمانی بلۏچی or رۏدرآتکی بلۏچی) is a dialect of the Balochi language spoken in Eastern Balochistan as well as in Punjab, and Sindh.

Relatively few studies have been devoted to Eastern Balochi compared to other dialects of the Balochi language. There is too little material available.

== Dialects ==
Researchers believe that Eastern Balochi is not a unified dialect, but rather a conglomerate of dialects often referred to by the tribal names of the speakers as the Marrī, Bugṭī, Leghārī, Mazārī, Buzdar, etc.

Sulaimani is found mainly in eastern Balochistan, covering parts of Pakistan, particularly in areas such as Quetta, Kalat, Khuzdar, Sindh and Punjab.

Eastern Hill Balochi dialects are spoken in the areas of the Marri, Bugti, Leghari, Buzdar and Mazari tribes. Mansel Longworth Dames, Portuguese language scholar was the first to study this dialect and called it Northern Balochi. The Baloch Talpurs ruled Sindh for a long time, which led to Baloch interaction with the inhabitants of Sindh, and over time, Eastern Balochi, particularly the one spoken in Sindh has been influenced by Sindhi to a minor extent, and the borrowed terms are of rare occurrence. It is spoken east of Quetta, Dera Ghazi Khan, Taunsa and from Sibi in the west nearly to the Indus river in the east.

== Phonology ==
The sound system of Eastern Balochi is different from Southern and Western Balochi. In Eastern Balochi, the sounds /f/, /kh/, and /gh/ are pronounced as /p/, /k/, /g/.

=== Vowles ===
Based on what Dames mentions, the Eastern Balochi has the long vowels a2, i2, u2, the short vowels a, i, u, and the vowels e, ai, o, au under the name of diphthongs.

Vowel systems in Eastern Balochi
Scholars	Vowel systems
Dames (1891)	ī, i, e, a, ā, o, u, ū
Grierson (1921)	ī, i, e, ē, a, ā, o, ō, u, ū
Bashir (2008)	ī, i, e, ē, a, ā, o, ō, u, ū, ã, ā̃, ẽ, ĩ, ī, õ

Eastern Balochi has its fricatives and acquired retroflex consonants, A fronting of ū > ī has taken place and n seems to have acquired phonemic status in Southern Balochi.

=== Consonants ===
The following table shows consonants which are common Southern Balochi.

Eastern Balochi Consonant Shift
	word-initial and postconsonantal position	postvocalic position
p, t, k	aspiration: pʰ tʰ kʰ	fricatives: f, ɕ, x
b, d, g	(no change: b, d, g)	fricatives: β, ʝ, ǧ
č, ǰ	aspiration: cʰ (no change: ǰ)	fricatives: š, ž
w	aspiration: wʰ	(no change: w)

Nasalization is phonemic in the eastern/Sulemani balochi

Consonants in Eastern Balochi Dialects of Sindh
		Labial	Dental/ Alveolar	Retroflex	Palatal	Velar	Glottal
Plosive/ Affricate	voiceless	p	t	ʈ	tʃ	k	
Plosive/ Affricate	voiced	b	d	ɖ	dʒ	ɡ	
Fricative	voiceless	f	s		ʃ	x	h
Fricative	voiced	β	z		ʒ	ɣ	
Nasal		m	n	(ɳ)			
Continuant		w	ɾ	ɽ	j		

In Eastern Balochi, it is noted that the stop and glide consonants may also occur as aspirated allophones in word initial position as [pʰ tʰ ʈʰ t͡ʃʰ kʰ] and [wʱ]. Allophones of stops in postvocalic position include for voiceless stops, [f θ x] and for voiced stops [β ð ɣ]. /n l/ are also dentalized as [n̪ l̪]. The complete set off, ʃ, β, x, ɣ, ǧ, it is present as regular phonemes in eastern balochi. In Eastern Hill Baluchi, θ and ’ from postvocalic t and d; and intervocalic b tends to become v.

=== Syllable ===
In Eastern Balochi, the last heavy syllable of a word is stressed. Complex verbs and preposition + noun are treated as a unit as far as stress is concerned.

== Grammar ==
The grammar of Eastern Balochi is similar to the grammar of other dialects of the Balochi language. The ending for the oblique plural of nouns is -ān, which is characteristic of Western Iranian languages. It uses the collective suffix -gal, which can function as a plural suffix.

== Vocabulary ==
English	Eastern Balochi	Southern Balochi	Western Balochi
Soil	Hākh	Hāk	Hak
Word	Lawz	Labz	lawz
Water	Āf	Āp	Ap
Bread	Naghan	Nagan	Nan
Mother	Māth	Māt	Mâs
Change	Bazal	Badal	Avaz
Sun	Rowsh/Rowž	Rowch	Rowch

== Example sentences ==
English	Eastern Balochi
I have a job.	Manā kār ē asten.
My name is Muhammad.	Maeen nam Muhammad'en.
I am eating food	Man naghana waraghan.

== See also ==
- Rakhshani dialect
- Makrani dialect
