= Southwestern Fars dialects =

Southwestern Iranian language spoken in Iran

Southwestern Fars
- Fars
- Tajiki
- Native to: Iran
- Native speakers: 100,000 (2012)
- Language family: Indo-European: Indo-Iranian; Iranian; Western Iranian; Southwestern; Persid; Southwestern Fars

Language codes
- ISO 639-3: fay
- Glottolog: sout2645

Southwestern Fars dialects, or simply Fars dialects, are a cluster of disparate dialects of Fars. The one illustrated here is the Davani dialect (Davani: devani; Persian: دوانی, transliteration: Davāni) of the village of Davan, 12 kilometers north of Kazerun city in southern Iran. Davani is listed as a Persid language distinct from other Southwestern Fars dialects in Windfuhr (2012). Details of the Fars dialects are found in Windfuhr (1999).

Davani had an estimated 1,000 speakers in 2004.

== Dialects ==
Lecoq (1989: 341) lists the following dialects, named after the towns or regions in which they are spoken:

Buringuni, Māsarmi, Somghuni, Pāpuni, Ardakāni, Kalāti, Xullāri, Kondāzi, Davāni.

To these Glottolog adds Judeo-Shirazi.

Ethnologue has a longer list, with some of the names likely synonyms for the ones above:

Basseri, Judeo-Shirazi (Old Shirazi), Delvari, Davani, Ahrami, Bandar Rig, Bardesuni (Bardestāni), Bēbehōni (Behbahāni), Bordekhuni, Dashtesuni (Dashtestāni), Dashtini, Dashtiyāti (Dashti), Gāvbandi, Genāve*i, Heshnizi, Jami, Kangāni, Khā*izi, Khenesiri, Khormuji, Qanavāti, Tangesiri.

(where * may be y, ʼ or zero).

== Phonology ==
The transcription used here is only an approximation.

=== Vowels ===
short: a, e, i, o, u
long: â, ā, ē, ī, ō, ū

=== Consonants ===
- voiced dental fricative: ð, generally after vowels, like in, 'bað' (bad).
- voiced velar fricative: γ, like in "γal'ati" (shroud).
- alveolar trill: like in 'borrâ' (flail).
- palatalization: inclination for 'g' and 'k' before front vowels, like in 'bega' (say).
- voiceless alveolar affricate: ts, like in 'tse' (what), and voiced dz, like in andzi (fig).

== Grammar ==
=== Verbs ===
Davani is ergative in past transitive constructions. For example (Persian transliterations are in UniPers):

English: Hasan saw Ali in the garden.
Persian: Hasan, Ali-râ tuye bâq did.
Davani: hasan-eš ali-a tu bâγ di.

Infinitive markers include -san, -tan, -dan, -ðan.

=== Nouns ===
The suffix -aku makes nouns definite. For example:

bard "stone" → bard-aku "the stone"

The plural is marked by the suffix -gal. -u is exceptionally used for "man". For example:

sēv "apple" → sēv-gal "apples"
merd "man" → merd-u "men"

=== Pronouns ===
Personal Pronouns
Person	Singular	Plural
1st	ma	mu
2nd	to	shumu
3rd	u oy	unā ushu

== Vocabulary ==
English	Davani	Persian (Unipers)
beautiful	ju, jônek	zibâ, xoščehre
blood	xin	xun
bread	nu, nen	nân
bring	avâðan	âvardan
brother	borâk, borâ	barâdar
come	ameðan, aneðan	âmadan
cry	gerīðan	geristan
dark	târīk	târik
daughter	dōt, dōðar	doxtar
day	ru, rez	ruz
do	kētan	kardan
door	dar	dar
die	mordan	mordan
donkey	xar	xar
egg	xoy	toxme morq
earth	zimi	zamin
eye	čiš	čašm
father	bu, bâva, bova	pedar
fear	ters	tars
fiancé	numzâð	nâmzad
fine	xoš	xoš
finger	pinja, piling	angošt
fire	tiš	âtaš, âzar
fish	meyi	mâhi
food / eat	xorâk/ xâtan	qazâ, xorâk / xordan
go	šeðan	raftan
god	xoðâ	xodâ
good	xūv	xub
great	got, γoč	bozorg, gonde, gat
hand	das	dast

English	Davani	Persian (Unipers)
head	tek, kalla, ser	sar, kalle
heart	del	del
horse	asp	asb, astar
house	xuna	xâne
language/tongue	zavu	zabân
laugh	xanda kētan	xandidan
man	merd	mard
moon	mā	mâh
mother	deyi, dey	mâdar, mâmân
mouth	kap, kač	dahân
name	num	nâm
night	šô	šab
open	vâkētan	bâz kardan
peace	sōl	âshti, ârâmeš, ârâmi
place	jo	jâ
read	xondan	xândan
say	gâ:tan	goftan, gap zadan
scratch	kerniðan	xârândan
sister	xāk, xā	xâhar
small	xujak, kem, xordek, rēz, vahila	kucak, kam, xord, riz
son	pos, keraku	pesar, pur, bacce
tall	boland	boland, bârez, derâz
three	so	se
water	ô	âb, ow
weave	vâtseriðan	bâftan
when	ki	key
wind	bâð	bâd
woman	zan	zan
yesterday	dig	diruz

== Example sentences ==
English	Davani	Persian	Unipers
What is this?	i tsi-yen?	این چیست؟	In cist?
Where is Ali?	ali an kâ?	علی کجاست؟	Ali kojâst?
This horse is white.	i asp-e espe-hâ.	.این اسب سفید است	In asb sefid ast.
Go (and) chain Rostam's hand (and) bring him here, so that I give you the crown and the kingdom.	beða dass-e rostam huven-eš bâ injo ke-t ma tâj šâi hâðe.	.برو دست رستم را ببند، اینجا بیاور تا من تاج شاهی را به تو بدهم	Boro daste Rostam râ beband, injâ beyâvar, tâ man tâje šâhi râ be to bedaham.
They say he works 10 hours a day.	mege-yen rez-i dā sât kâr mēku.	.میگویند روزی ده ساعت کار میکند	Miguyand ruzi dah sâat kâr mikonad.
I have two small brothers and sisters.	dikko-m borô xey-e xord-ek he.	.دو برادر و خواهر کوچک دارم	Do barâdar va xâhare kucak dâram.
If you will go just once to their village, you won't forget the hospitality of its people.	agar hami akeš-a šesse-bi-ya velât-ešu hargese-tu meymu dâri-šu az yâð nemēšu.	.اگر تنها یکبار به ده آنها رفته باشی، مهمان‌نوازی مردم آنجا را هرگز از یاد نخواهی برد	Agar tanhâ yekbâr be dehe ânhâ rafte bâši, mehmânnavâziye mardome ânjâ râ hargez az yâd naxâhid bord.
Who called me?	ke-š čer-om ze?	چه کسی مرا صدا زد؟	Cekasi marâ sedâ zad?

== See also ==
- Achomi language
- Dialects of Fars
- Persian dialects and varieties
- Southwestern Iranian languages
- Iranian languages
