= Old Kazeruni dialect =

Extinct Southwestern Iranian language

Old Kazeruni
- کازرونی قدیم
- Native to: Iran
- Region: Kazerun
- Extinct: (date missing)
- Language family: Indo-European: Indo-Iranian; Iranian; Western Iranian; Southwestern Iranian; Old Kazeruni

Official status
- Regulated by: Academy of Persian Language and Literature

Language codes
- ISO 639-3: –
- Glottolog: None

The Old Kazeruni dialect (Persian: کازرونی قدیم, UniPers: Kâzeruniye qadim) is an extinct Southwestern Iranian language spoken in the city of Kazerun in Southern Iran.

== Sample sentences ==
English	Old Kazeruni	Persian	Unipers
Oh, bad luck, leave me alone. Indeed, you would dissipate me.	bahte bevad as teye men alest meγer kem febeva bekami darin.?	.ای بخت بد از پیش من برخیز مگر مرا به باد خواهی داد	Ey baxte bad az piše man barxiz magar marâ be bâd xâhi dâd.
The consequence of his fifty years deeds was this, I witnessed that too.	kar-e penza sal-eš em bu oyzemân di.	.سرانجام کار پنجاه ساله‌اش این بود، آن نیز دیدم	saranjâme kâre panjâh sâleaš in bud, ân niz didam.

== See also ==
- Dialects of Fars
- Persian dialects and varieties
- Southwestern Iranian languages
- Iranian languages
