= Shanbehzadeh Ensemble =

Iranian folk band

- Origin: Bushehr, Iran
- Genres: Folk, pop,
- Years active: 1990–present
- Label: Buda Musique
- Members: Saeed Shanbezadeh; Naghib Shanbehzadeh; Habib Meftah Bushehri

The Shanbehzadeh Ensemble (Persian: گروه شنبه زاده) is an Iranian folk band, formed in Bushehr in 1990. The band offers a rare aspect of the traditional music and dance of the Persian Gulf, more specially of the province of Bushehr, south of Iran and bordering Persian gulf.

The principal instruments of the ensemble are the neyanbān (bagpipe), ney-jofti (flute), dammām (drum), zarbetempo (percussion), traditional flute, senj (cymbal) and boogh (a goat's horn). The ensemble has performed in front of audiences in Iran, Europe and North America.

== History ==
The band was founded by internationally acclaimed Iranian musician and dancer, Saeed Shanbezadeh in 1990. Saied, who traces his ancestry to Zanzibar in East Africa, was born in Bushehr, Iran, where he started playing music at the age of 7 with the old masters of the music of the region. He began with percussions, singing, and traditional dance. At 20 he founded the group of Shanbehzadeh Ensemble and won the 1st prize at the Fajr Music Festival in Tehran in 1990. In 1996 he was invited by the University of Toronto to teach a half-a-year course. In 2007 he was invited again by La Cité de La Musique of Paris to teach dance, singing and music. In 1998 he was named the professor and director of the House of Culture, Music and Dance of the Isle of Kish in Iran. That same year he portrayed himself in Dialogue with the Wind by Bahram Beyzaei.

Saeed Shanbehzadeh left Iran in 2002 and now lives in Paris.

== Band members ==
=== Current members ===
- Saeid Shanbehzadeh – neyanbān, neydjofti, dammām
- Naghib Shanbehzadeh - tombak, zarbetempo

Saeid Shanbehzadeh : Composer

Saeed Shanbezadeh began playing music at the age of seven in his native town of Boushehr in southern Iran with old music masters from the area and according to the local oral traditions. He first learned percussion and singing, then Neyanban (bagpipe), Neyjofti (double flute) and traditional dances.

At the age of twenty he created his own traditional music group, the Zâr Ensemble (before called Shanbezadeh's Ensemble) which won the first prize at the Fajr Festival in Tehran in 1990. At the same time he also began to conduct research and write about southern Iranian music in Iranian periodicals. His research on the ethnomusicology of the region led him to collect many different types of local music and create sound archives for this music. As a result of his research and his concerts he is now a nationally and internationally known musician.

In 1996 he was invited to spend a semester at the University of Toronto. In 1998 he was named professor and director at the House of Culture and Music of the island of Kish (Iran). In 2001 the French Montalvo/Hervieu Company invited him to participate in creating and touring with the "Babelle Heureuse" show, which was performed more than two hundred times in France, Europe and Brazil.

He also composed film scores and acted for a variety of film directors, such as Mohssen Makhmalbaf for the film "Dar" ("The Door"), Bahram Bayzai for "Gouf te gou ba bad" ("Speak with the Wind") and Rakhshan Banietemad for "Baran va boumi" ("Baran and the Citizen").

Naghib Shanbehzadeh : Tombak, Zarbetempo

Young skilled percussionist, Naghib began playing music in Boushehr and Kish with his father at the age of three. He learnt traditional percussions from the south of Iran (Dammâm, Doholgap, Pipè, Kesser, Tempo) and classical ones (Zarb). From the age of 10, he played concerts with famous musicians such as Billy Cobham, Manu Codja and Matthieu Donarier.

Now he studies occidental percussions at the « Conservatoire de Créteil ».

Collaborators

Matthieu Donarier: Saxophones (soprano, tenor)

He shares his time between various groups : Daniel Humair's "Baby Boom," Gabor Gado Quartet, Le sacre du Tympan, Caratini Jazz Ensemble, Stephan Oliva quintet, etc.

Manu Codjia: Electric guitar

Musical partner of Erick Truffaz, he has also played with Daniel Humair's "Baby Boom," Henri Texier, Aldo Romano, Moniomania and has participated in a dozen of other musical projects.

Joe Quitzke: Drums

Joe is Swedish and grew up in Andalusia. He traveled extensively before settling in France. For the last three years, he's been associated with all of Francois Jeanneau's projects (trio, quartet, orchestra). He is a member of the Gabor Gado Quartet.

== See also ==
- Persian traditional music
- Music of Iran
