= Rakhshani dialect =

Dialect of Western Balochi

Rakhshani
- رخشانی
- Native to: Pakistan, Iran Afghanistan, Turkmenistan
- Region: Balochistan
- Language family: Indo-European: Indo-Iranian; Iranian; Western Iranian; Northwestern; Balochi; Western–Southern Balochi; Western Balochi; Rakhshani
- Dialects: Sarhaddi; Kalati; Panjguri
- Writing system: Balochi alphabet

Language codes
- ISO 639-2: bgn
- ISO 639-3: bgn – inclusive code Individual code: bgn – Western Balochi
- Glottolog: west2368
- Linguasphere: 58-AAB-ab

Rakhshani (Balochi: رخشانی), also referred to as Western Balochi (رونیندی بلۏچی, romanized: Roanindi Balòči) is a dialect of the Balochi language. The dialect has several important subdialects and spoken predominantly in Pakistan, Iran, Afghanistan and Turkmenistan.

The Ethnologue database has classified the dialect under Western Balochi.

== Dialects ==
Elfenbein divides the Rakhshani dialect into three categories:

- Kalati (areas between Las Bela in the north of Karachi to Mastung in the south of Quetta, Chaghi, and Kharan).
- Panjguri (southern and southwestern areas of Afghanistan, mainly the areas around the Helmand River).
- Sarhaddi (an area that extends from the east to Dalbandin in Pakistan and from the northeast to Chahar Burjak in Afghanistan, and includes Merv in Turkmenistan and Sistan in Iran, with Nosratabad within Iran forming its southernmost part).

== Phonology ==
Western Balochi has 21 consonant phonemes and 6 vowel phonemes.

Rakhshani consonants
Consonant vowels	p, t, t̥, č, k, b, d, d̥, ǰ, g, (ƒ), s, š, (x), h, z, ž, (ġ), m, n, r, r̥, l, w, y
long vowels	aː, iː, uː
Short vowel	a, e, o
Compound vowel	ı͂, o͂, u͂

=== Vowels ===
three short and five long vowels for the Rakhshani dialect as ə, y, w, a, i, u, e, o (adapted: a, i, u, aː, iː, uː eː, oː). nasalized ones a͂, e͂, ı͂, o͂, u͂, “of which only a͂, e͂ are common in the Rakhshani dia-lects.

Vowel systems in Western Balochi dialects
Scholars	Vowel systems	Dialects
Rzehak (2003)	ī, i, ē, a, ā, ō, u, ū	Rakhshani in Afghanistan
Axenov (2006)	ī, i, ē, a, ā, ō, u, ū	Rakhshani in Turkmenistan
Ahangar (2007)	ī, i, e, ē, a, ā, o, ō, u, ū	Sarhaddi in Iran

=== Consonants ===
The consonants /p/, /t/, /t̥/, /č/, /k/, /b/, /d/, /d̥/, /ǰ/, /g/, /(ƒ)/, /s/, /š/, /(x)/, /h/, /z/, /ž/, /(ġ)/, /m/, /n/, /r/, /r̥/, /l/, /w/ and /y/ are articulated as alveolar in Western Balochi. The plosives /t/ and /d/ are dental in both dialects. The symbol ń is used to denote nasalization of the preceding vowel. The consonants /s/, /z/, /n/, /ɾ/ and /l/ are articulated as alveolar in Western Balochi.

The consonants /f x ġ/ in the Rakhshani dialect often remain, but in Makrani they become /p/, /k/ or /h/, and /g/, respectively. In addition, /f/ occurs in a few words in Southern Balochi. /x/ (voiceless velar fricative) in some loanwords in Southern Balochi corresponding to /ʁ/ (voiced uvular fricative) in Western Balochi.

Consonants in Western Balochi dialects
		Labial	Dental/ Alveolar	Retroflex	Palatal	Velar	Glottal
Plosive/ Affricate	voiceless	p	t	t̥	č	k	
Plosive/ Affricate	voiced	b	d	d̥	J̌	ɡ	
Fricative	voiceless	(ƒ)	s		Š	(x)	h
Fricative	voiced	β	z		ž	(ǧ)	
Nasal		m	n				
Taps			r	r̥			
Glides		w			y		

=== Syllable ===
In Western Balochi dialects the stress is on the last syllable of the word as a rule. The pronominal suffixes and the present copula, which are enclitic except for the individuation marker -e. For inflected forms of the interrogative pronouns č ē 'what' are stressed on the first syllable.

The negative prefix na- and the prohibitive prefix ma- attract the stress. Verb forms with the prefix b(i) likewise have the stress on the first syllable thus on the first syllable of the stem if the vowel of the prefix is omitted, see and the nominal part of complex predicates takes the phrase stress. Inflected forms of the interrogative pronouns ce 'what' are stressed on the first syllable, however. There are also a few adverbs that are stressed on the first syllable.

== Grammar ==
In the Rakhshani dialect, the infinitive noun is often formed from the past participle and ends in -tin. The active adjective, the future passive adjective (= imperative adjective) and the active noun are formed by adding the suffixes ān-, -agī(g) and -ōk to the present participle, respectively, and the passive adjective is formed by adding the suffix -a(g) to the past participle.

In some dialects of Balochi spoken in Western Balochistan the construction employs the verb twánag (past stem twánt) "to be able to" + present-future subjunctive forms of the main verb. Twánag "to be able to" is conjugated as a transitive verb.

The Western Balochi dialects have -ay for the genitive and -ârā or -ānā for the object.

Western Balochi dialects are moving from a split ergative toward a nominative - accusative (NOM- ACC) system. The subject is marked as nominative except for the past tense constructions where the subject of a transitive verb is marked as oblique and the verb agrees with the object. Balochi, like many Western Iranian languages, has lost the old Iranian gender distinctions.

Sentence	Meaning
ما توانین بیاین	"We can come"
آیان نتوانت اِدا لوگے اد بکننت	"They could not build a house here"

=== Pronouns ===
Pronouns	Rakhshani (Western)	Makrani (Southern)
1st person	من	من
2nd person	تو	تو
3rd person	آ‌/آئی	آ/آیی
1st person (plural)	ئما‌/هما	مشما‌/ما
2nd person (plural)	شما	شما
3rd person (plural)	آوان	آیاں

== Dialects ==
=== Sarhaddi ===
One of the sub-dialects of Rakhshani is the Sarhaddi (سرحدی) dialect, which is more influenced by the Persian language and in which words, compounds and even grammatical structures of the Persian language are more commonly seen; that is, words from Modern "New" Persian have been used after phonetic changes, as well as a number of Persian grammatical structures in this dialect.

For example, words from Persian that end in "unvoiced ha" are considered after converting "e" to "g" and "e" is converted to "g" and used in the Sarhaddi. Sarhaddi includes infinitive, adverbial (subject noun and object noun) and infinitive noun, all of which are made from the verb stem and certain suffixes.

=== Northern Rakhshani ===
Northern Rakhshani has similarities with Sarhaddi, and Turkmen Rakhshani (see also: Baloch of Turkmenistan) also originated from Balochi Rakhshani. The difference between Northern Rakhshani and Sarhaddi is that: In the past tense, the letter "g" has been removed from Northern Rakhshani, but it is still present in Sarhaddi.

Sarhaddi	Northern	Persian	English
نشتهگون	نشتهاون	نشسته‌ام	"I am sitting"
شتگ اون	شوتهاون	رفته‌ام	"I am gone"
وانتگ اون	وانتهاون	خوانده‌ام	"I have read"
دیستگ اون	دیستهاون	دیده‌ام	"I have seen"
زانتگ اون	زانتهاون	دانسته‌ام	"I have known"

Northern Rakhshani is spoken in the provinces of Nimroz, Farah, Helmand, Kandahar, Herat, and some northern provinces of Afghanistan.

=== Rakhshani of Turkmenistan ===
The Baloch of Turkmenistan speak a dialect of the Balochi language that is very close to the Balochi dialect of the Baloch people of Afghanistan. The Balochi dialect of Turkmenistan belongs to the Rakhshani dialect.

Some verb constituents have gradually been eliminated from this dialect, but traces of them still exist. The third-person singular indefinite pronoun (or pronoun suffix) is often used with transitive verbs, and sometimes without transitive verbs.

== Vocabulary ==
Following are comparing the vocabulary of the Makrani and Sarhaddi dialects:

English	Rakshani (Sarhaddi)	Southern Balochi (Makrani)
Look	sayl kanag	čârag
Child	zahg	čokk
Cradle	juṭṭ	gwânzag
River	rôd	kawr
Misery	morr	muzz
Breakfast	nâštâ	nahâri
thin	nâzork	nâzorok
Cotton	pammag	pambag
Sarcasm	šegân	šagâm
Salt	šôr	wad
Shadow	syâheg	sâheg
Yogurt	bastag	mastag

== See also ==
- Makrani dialect
- Soleimani dialect
