= Abdui =

Abdui عبدویی
- Village
- Location within Iran
- Coordinates: 29°35′57″N 51°51′47″E
- Country: Iran
- Province: Fars
- County: Kazerun
- Bakhsh: Kuhmareh
- Rural District: Dasht-e Barm

Population (2006)
  - Total: 525
- Time zone: UTC+3:30 (IRST)
  - Summer (DST): UTC+4:30 (IRDT)

Abdui (Persian: عبدویی, also Romanized as 'Abdū’ī; also known as 'Abdūl and Abdūnī) is a village in Dasht-e Barm Rural District, Kuhmareh District, Kazerun County, Fars province, Iran. At the 2006 census, its population was 525, in 123 families.
