= Lashar =

Village in Sistan and Baluchestan Province, Iran

Coordinates: 26°40′N 60°15′E

Lashar (Persian: لاشار) is a small village in the southeastern province Sistan and Baluchestan in Iran.

Most people of Lashar are Afro-Iranians, many of whom were sent to the south of Iran by the Portuguese as well as by Persian and Arab slave traders.

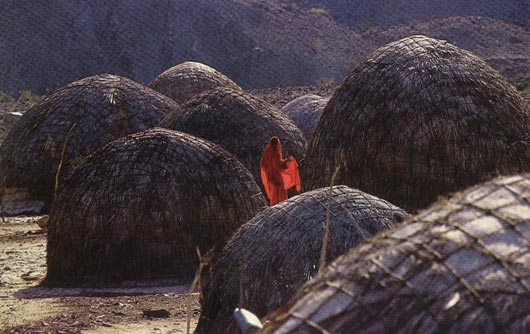
A village in Lashar

Entrance to a "toup", house of palm branches. Walls of these houses are covered with a mixture of straw and mud and their ceiling is covered by "daz" (fan palm) leaves.

== See also ==
- Afro-Iranians
