= Davan, Fars =

Davan دوان
- Village
- Location within Iran
- Coordinates: 29°42′06″N 51°40′32″E
- Country: Iran
- Province: Fars
- County: Kazerun
- Bakhsh: Central
- Rural District: Deris

Population (2006)
  - Total: 601
- Time zone: UTC+3:30 (IRST)
  - Summer (DST): UTC+4:30 (IRDT)

Davan (Persian: دوان, also Romanized as Davān, Dawan, and Dovān) is a village in Deris Rural District, in the Central District of Kazerun County, Fars province, Iran. In the Davani dialect it is pronounced : do'u At the 2006 census, its population was 601, in 178 families.

== Language ==
The Davani dialect is a Southwestern Iranian language that is spoken in this village.
