= Wikitongues =

Non-profit organisation promoting all the languages in the world

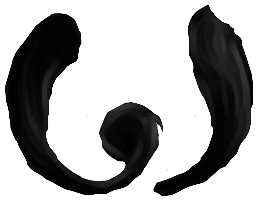
- Wikitongues logo
- Founder: Frederico Andrade, Daniel Bögre Udell, Lindie Botes
- Type: Non-profit
- Volunteers: 1500
- Website: wikitongues.org

Wikitongues is an American non-profit organization registered in the state of New York. It aims to sustain and promote all the languages in the world. It was founded by Frederico Andrade, Daniel Bögre Udell and Lindie Botes in 2014.

== Oral histories ==
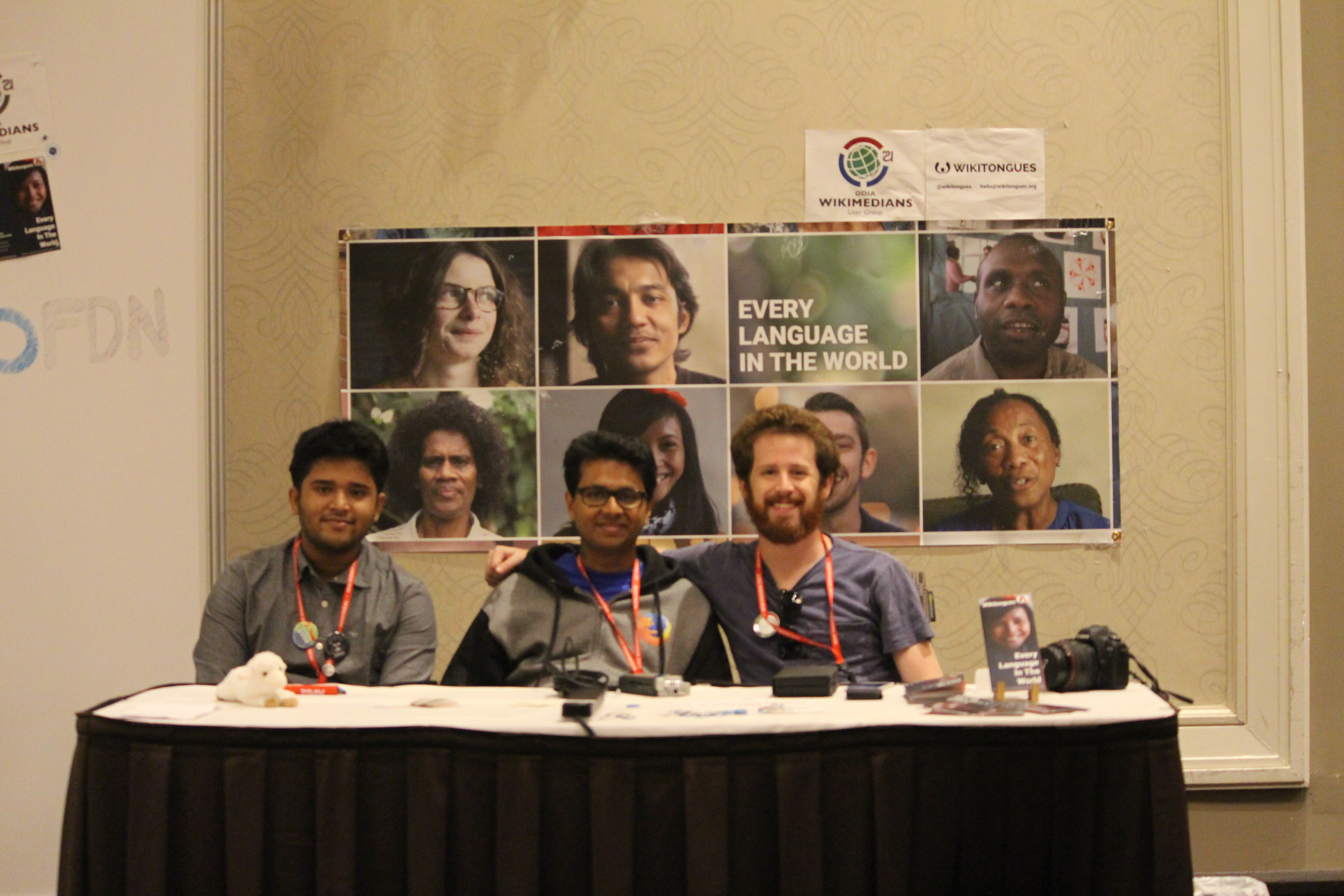
Wikitongues contributors in Montreal during Wikimania 2017

By May 2016, Wikitongues had recorded around 329 videos in over 200 languages. As of 2018, they have recorded more than 350 languages, or 5% of the languages in the world. They also have 15% of their videos subtitled through the organization Amara, formerly known as Universal Subtitles, which is a web-based non-profit project that hosts and allows user-subtitled video to be accessed and created.

== Poly ==
Poly is open-source software built to share and learn languages. The project was supported on Kickstarter and the organization was able to raise US$52,716 with the help of 429 backers. Currently the software is under development.

== Methods ==
Wikitongues share its methods and tools online, such as the Language Sustainability Toolkit.

== Further media ==
- "Saving Languages From Extinction". Great Big Story. YouTube. 17 April 2019.
- Elmasry, Faiza (12 February 2019). "Wikitongues Seeks to Save World's Dying Languages". Voice of America.
