= Gilan (disambiguation) =

Gilan is a province of Iran.

Gilan or Ghilan may also refer to:

== Places ==
- Gilan, Kerman, a village in Kerman Province, Iran
- Gilan, Khuzestan, a village in Khuzestan Province, Iran
- Gilan, Kurdistan, a village in Kurdistan Province, Iran
- Gilan, Lorestan, a village in Lorestan Province, Iran
- Gilan, Semnan, a village in Semnan Province, Iran
- Gilan-e Gharb, a city in Kermanshah Province, Iran
- Gjilan, a town in Kosovo, formerly known as Gilan and Ghilan
- Janda, Afghanistan, a village in Afghanistan
- Soviet Republic of Gilan, a short-lived Soviet republic in the province of Gilan, Iran

== People ==
- Maxim Ghilan, the Israeli poet and activist

== See also ==
- Gilak (disambiguation)
- Gilaki (disambiguation)
- Gilani (disambiguation)
- Giljan (Serbian Cyrillic: Гиљан), the old name for Gnjilane (Albanian: Gjilan)
- Jilan (disambiguation)
- Yilan (disambiguation)
- Gilaki and Mazandarani (disambiguation)
