= Gilani =

Origin
- Derivation: Gelae (tribe)
- Meaning: Toponymic surname meaning "from Gilan"

Other names
- Variant forms: Gillani, Geelani, Kilani, Kailani, Kaylani, Jilani

Gilani, Gillani, or Geelani (Persian/Urdu: گیلانی, Arabic: الجيلاني) is a toponymic surname and nisba meaning “From Gilan”, a historic region on the southern coast of the Caspian Sea. The name was originally used to identify people whose geographic origin was Gilan. Over time, the surname also became associated with lineages part of the Hasanid family and claiming descent from Abdul Qadir Gilani, the Persian born Islamic scholar. Abdul Qadir Gilani is known for being the founder and eponym of the Qadiriyya order of the mystical Sufi branch of Islam.

Variations of the surname include Kilani or Kailani (Arabic: الكيلاني), commonly used in the Arab world, and Jilani. The levantine Zoubi family also share the same lineage, as their ancestor Ahmad Ali Al Gilani was titled Al-Zoubi later in life. Members of the Gilani family can be found in the Middle East, North Africa, and South Asia.

== Lineage ==
The Gilani family descends from Abdul Qadir Gilani (1078–1166), the founder of the Qadiriyya Sufi order and a notable Sunni Hanbali scholar. Abdul Qadir was considered to be a Sayyid as both of his parents were direct descendants of the Islamic prophet Muhammad. His father, Musa (Abu Saleh) bin Abdullah, was a direct descendant of Muhammad's grandson Hasan, and his mother, Fatima (Umm al-Khair) Bint Abdullah Al Soma'ai Al-Husseini, was a descendant of Muhammad through his grandson Hussein.

== Derivation ==
Gilani is a nisba meaning from Gilan. Abdul Qadir was given the nisba after traveling to Baghdad in 1095 AD at 18 years old to pursue the study of Hanbali law. There are conflicting reports about the birthplace of Abdul Qadir and in turn, the true origin of the surname; while some sources maintain that he was born in the Iranian province of Gilan, others maintain that he was born in Gilan-e-Gharb, a city in the Kurdish Kermanshah province, or in the village of Jilan near Baghdad.

== Notable members ==
- Abd Al-Rahman Al-Gilani (1841–1927), first Prime Minister of Iraq in 1920
- Abderrazak Kilani (born 1954), Tunisian politician and lawyer
- Abdul Qader al-Keilani (1874–1948), early 20th century Syrian statesman and religious authority
- Abdul Qadir Gilani (1077–1166), 12th century Muslim Saint, Scholar and Author of books on spirituality
- Abdulfattah Al-Zoubi Al-Jilani (1840–1935), Lebanese Muslim jurist and writer
- Abdulhaleem Al-Kailani (born 1957), mayor of Amman from 2012 to 2013
- Ahmed Gailani (1932–2017), Afghan politician
- Ali Hassan Gilani (1974–2024), Pakistani politician
- Ali Shah Geelani (1929–2021), Kashmiri separatist leader and member of the All Parties Hurriyat Conference
- Basil Kilani (born 1960), Jordanian long-distance runner and Olympian
- Bahadur Khan Gilani, officer of the Gujarat Sultanate in India
- Benjamin Gilani (born 1946), Indian theatre and television actor
- Daood Gilani, pseudonym of David Headley, Pakistani−American convict for the 2008 Mumbai attacks
- Fayyaz Gilani, retired Pakistani naval attaché and vice admiral in the Pakistan Navy and the former vice chief of the naval staff.
- Feras Kilani (born 1976), Palestinian-British journalist, film-maker, and BBC Arabic's special correspondent
- Faleh Al-Kilani (born 1944), Iraqi scholar, poet, and writer
- Fatima Gailani (born 1954), Afghan political leader and women's rights activist
- Fauzia Gailani (born 1971), Afghan politician
- Haifa Al Kaylani, founder and president of the Arab International Women's Forum
- Haji Gilani (died 2003), participant in the 2001 Afghan war
- Hakim Ali Gilani (died 1609), 16th-century physician in Mughal India
- Hamid Raza Gilani (1936–2004), Pakistani politician and ambassador
- Hikmad Zaid Al-Kilani (born 1945), Palestinian politician
- Ibrahim Zeid Keilani (1937–2013), Jordanian Muslim cleric and politician
- Iftikhar Hussain Gillani, Pakistani Former Federal Minister for Law and Justice
- Imtiaz Gilani (born 1947), Pakistani engineer and academic
- Ishaq Gailani (born 1954), Afghan Politician
- Jamila Gilani (born 1960), Pakistani politician and leader of the Pashtun Tahafuz Movement
- Kamel al-Kilani (born 1958), minister in the Iraqi Interim Council
- Kamel Keilany (1897–1959), Egyptian writer
- Lamia Al-Gailani Werr (1938–2019), Iraqi archaeologist
- Leïla Kilani (born 1970), Moroccan director, screenwriter, and producer
- Majed Kilani (born 1997), Tunisian tennis player
- Manazir Ahsan Gilani, Indian Muslim philosopher from Gilan, Bihar
- Mian Ghulam Jilani (1914–2004), critic of the Bhutto government
- Mohammad Kilani (died 2016), Jordanian politician and Minister of Water in 1989
- Mohammad Mohammadi Gilani (born 1928), Iranian cleric and religious authority
- Mohammad Rasoul Al-Kailani (1933–2003), founder and first director of the Jordanian General Intelligence Department.
- Mubarak Ali Gilani (1936–2021), Pakistani Sufi leader
- Mumtaz Alam Gillani (born 1940), Pakistani lawyer and politician
- Musa Zaid Kailani (1939–2019), Jordanian diplomat and academic
- Naguib al-Kilani (1931–1995), Egyptian poet and novelist
- Nevine El Kelany (born 1964), Egyptian academic and current Minister of Culture
- Nezam al-Din Ahmad Gilani (1585 – c. 1662), philosopher and physician during the Deccan Sultanate in India
- Ouided Kilani (born 1982), Tunisian handball player
- Rashid Ali al-Gilani (1892–1965), Prime Minister of Iraq in 1933 and 1941
- Reem Kelani (born 1963), British-Palestinian musician
- Sarwat Gilani (born 1982), Pakistani actress and model
- Wafaa El Kilani (born 1972), Egyptian television presenter
- Yousaf Raza Gillani (born 1952), Prime Minister of Pakistan from March 24, 2008, to April 26, 2012
- Zahed Gilani (1216–1301), 13th century leader of the Zahediyeh Sufi order
- Zaid Kilani (1938–2019), Jordanian physician and founder of Farah General Hospital

== See also ==
- Gilaki (disambiguation)
- Gilak (disambiguation)
- Jilan (disambiguation)
- Gilan (disambiguation)
- List of people from Gilan
