= Gilaki and Mazandarani =

Gilaki and Mazandarani may refer to:

- Gilaki people, people native to the northern Iran province of Gilan
- Gilaki language, a Caspian language spoken in Iran's Gilan, Mazanderan, Qazvin Province
- Mazanderani people, Iranian people whose homeland is the North of Iran (Tabaristan)
- Mazanderani language, an Iranian language spoken mainly in Iran's Mazandaran, Tehran and Golestan provinces

== See also ==
- Gilaki (disambiguation)
- Mazanderani (disambiguation)
- Tabrian (disambiguation)
- Caspian people (disambiguation)
- Caspian languages, the group to which the Gilaki and Mazandarani languages belong
- Iranian peoples, a diverse Indo-European ethno-linguistic group
