= Caspian people (disambiguation) =

Caspian people are an ancient people living on the southern and southwestern shores of the Caspian Sea.

Caspian people may also refer to the following:

- Speakers of the northwest Iranian Caspian languages, including Taleshi, Gilaki, Mazandarani and related dialects

== See also ==
- Caspian (disambiguation)
- Caspian race
- Mazanderani people
- Gilaks
