= Jilan =

Jilan may refer to:

- Cilən, Azerbaijan
- Jilan, Iran, a village in Semnan Province, Iran
- Gilan province, Iran
- 吉兰 (吉蘭), a geographic name in the medieval Chinese literature

== See also ==
- Gilan (disambiguation)
- Gilak (disambiguation)
- Gilani (disambiguation)
- Gilaki (disambiguation)
- Jiran, India
