= Sowme'eh Sara =

City in Gilan province, Iran

Sowme'eh Sara Persian: صومعه سرا
- City
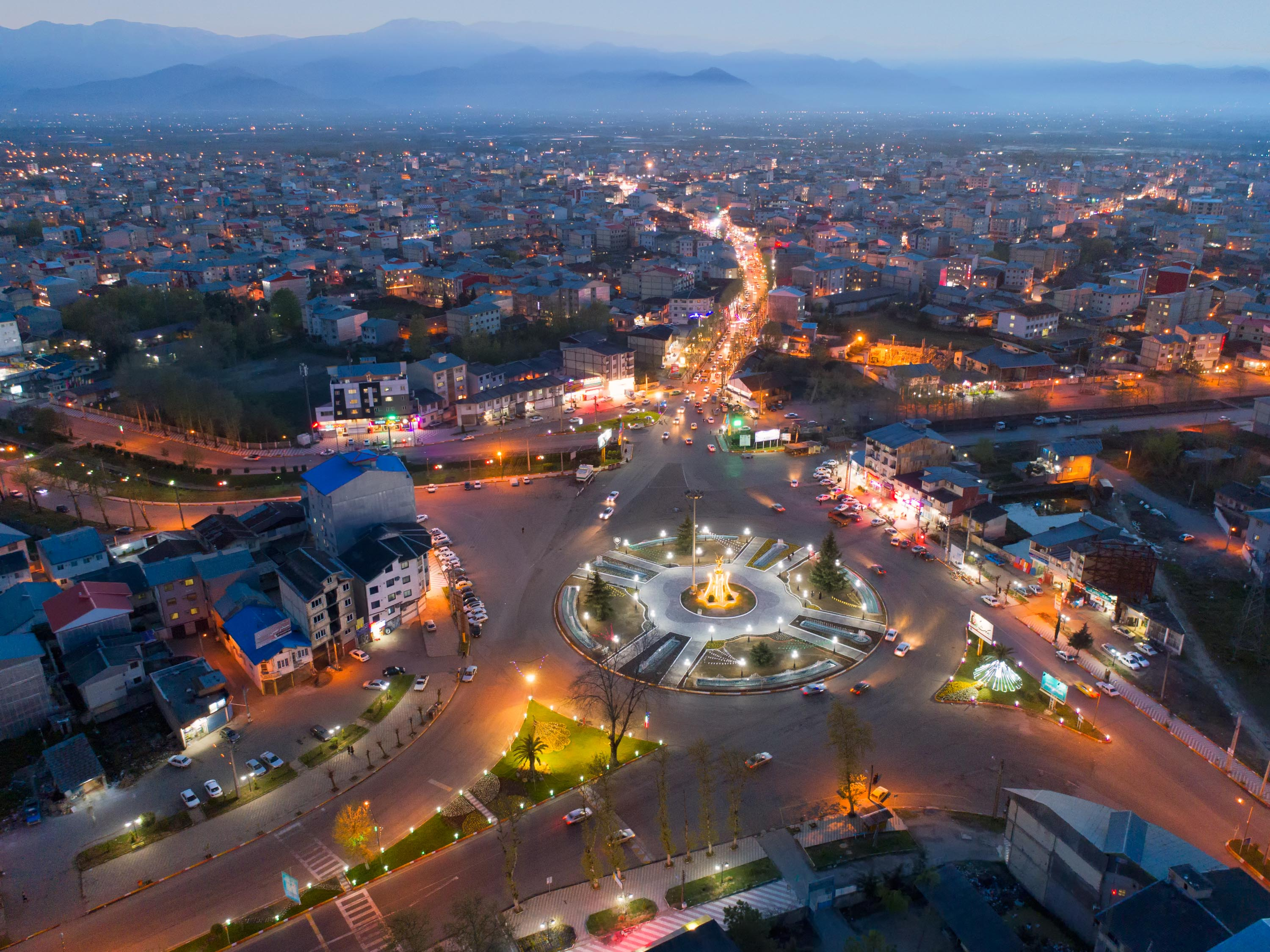

- Location within Iran
- Coordinates: 37°18′00″N 49°18′51″E
- Country: Iran
- Province: Gilan
- County: Sowme'eh Sara
- District: Central

Population (2016)
  - Total: 47,083
- Time zone: UTC+3:30 (IRST)

Sowme'eh Sara (Persian: صومعه‌سرا) (Note: Also romanized as Şowma‘eh Sarā, Şowme‘eh Sarā, Sumasara, Şūme‘eh Sarā, and Sumehsara; also known as Somee Sara; Gilaki: سۊماسرا) is a city in the Central District of Sowme'eh Sara County, Gilan province, Iran, serving as capital of both the county and the district. The city is on the south coast of the Caspian Sea, about 25 kilometres (16 mi) west of Rasht.

== Demographics ==
=== Language and ethnicity ===
The people of Sowme'eh Sara are mostly Gilaks and speak the Sowme'eh Sarai variety of Western Gilaki.

Linguistic composition of the city.

Sowme'eh Sara linguistic composition
language	percent
New Persian	70%
Gilaki	25%
Azerbaijani	5%

=== Population ===
At the time of the 2006 National Census, the city's population was 36,522 in 10,070 households. The following census in 2011 counted 40,978 people in 12,325 households. The 2016 census measured the population of the city as 47,083 people in 15,331 households.

== Agriculture ==
Rice has been cultivated in this region for many years, where some indigenous cultivars (landrace) were conventionally bred by farmers.
