= Mazanderani =

Mazanderani (Persian: مازندرانی), also spelled Mazandarani, or Tabarian (طبریان) may refer to:

- Mazanderani people or Tabari people, a Caspian people in the North of Iran
- Mazanderani language or Tabarian language, an Iranian language of the Northwestern branch spoken mainly in the South Caspian region
- Mazandaran province, a province of Iran located along the southern coast of the Caspian Sea

== Surname ==
- Ali Asghar Mazandarani (1826–1911), Iranian cleric
- Fereidoun Ali-Mazandarani, Iranian fighter pilot
- Mírzá Asadu’llah Fádil Mázandarání (1880–1957), Iranian Bahá'í scholar
- Mohammad Salih al-Mazandarani (fl. 1081 AH, 11th century AD), Shi'a Islamic commentator
- Morteza Sadouqi Mazandarani (born 1946), Iranian grand Ayatollah
- Musa ibn Khalil Mazandarani, 19th century Persian scribe and scholar

== See also ==
- Mazanderani dance
- Mazanderani calendar
- Tabrian (disambiguation)
- Gilaki (disambiguation)
- Gilaki and Mazandarani (disambiguation)
