= Western Gilaki =

Gilaki dialect of Gilan, Iran

Bie Pas Gilaki
- Western Gilaki
- بيه پسي گيلکي (Bie Pөsi Gilөki)
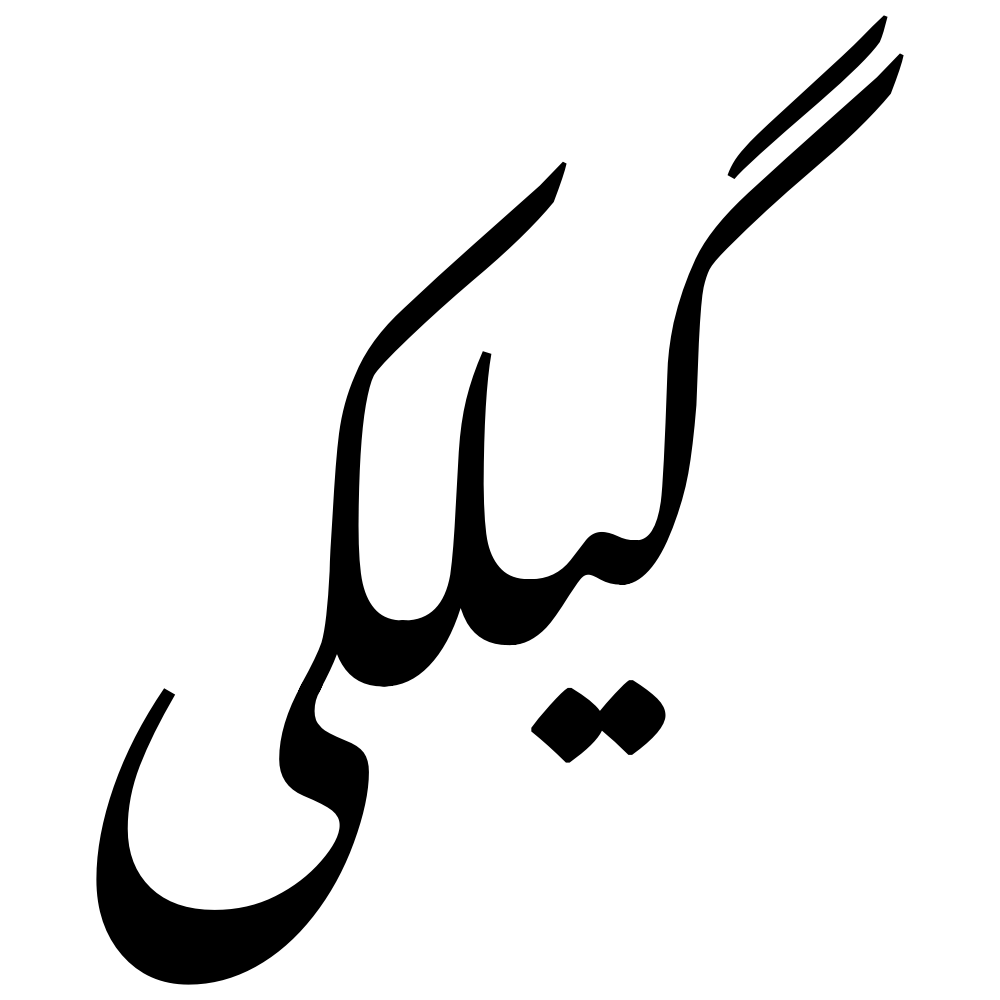
- Gilaki in Nastaliq style (گیلکی)
- Native to: Iran
- Language family: Indo-European: Indo-Iranian; Iranian; Western Iranian; Northwestern Iranian; Caspian; Gilaki; Bie Pas Gilaki

Language codes
- ISO 639-3: glk
- Glottolog: west2931
- Linguasphere: 58-AAC-eb

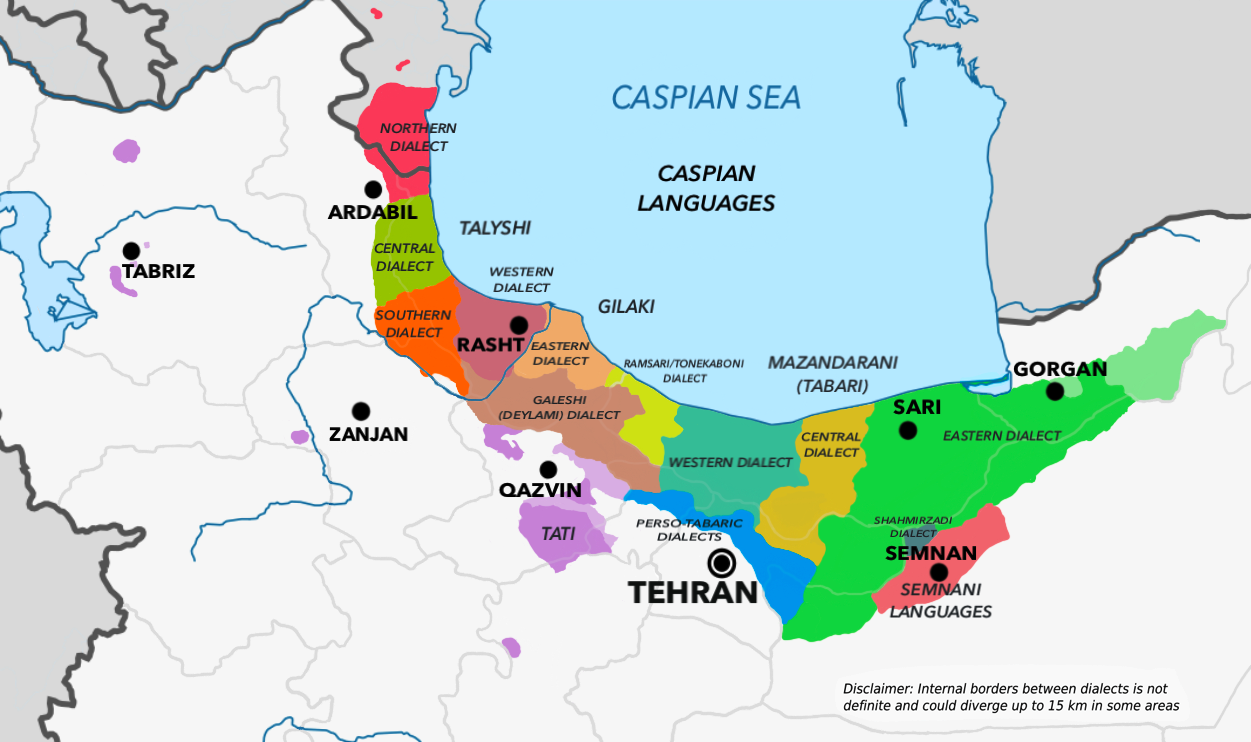
Map depicting areas where Western Gilaki is spoken

Western or Bie Pas Gilaki is a dialect of the Gilaki language spoken in the western portion of Gilan province, Iran.

== Distribution ==
The Gilaki language consists of three dialects; Western (Bie Pas), Eastern (Bie Pish) and Galeshi (Deylami). Bie Pas Gilaki is spoken west of Sepid Rud river.

According to Glottolog, Western Gilaki is the predominant dialect in Fuman, Rasht and Bandar-e Anzali. According to the scholar and geographer Manouchehr Sotoudeh, Bie Pas Gilaki is spoken in Chahar Farizeh (Bandar-e Anzali), Gaskar/Ziabar), Kasma, Tulem (Sowme'eh Sara), Shaft, Sangar (Rasht) and Lasht-e Nesha.
