= Khij =

Khij or KHIJ may refer to:

- Khij, Razavi Khorasan, a village in Iran
- Khij, Semnan, a village in Iran
- KHIJ-LP, a radio station (106.3 FM) in Ottumwa, Iowa
- KYLI, a radio station (96.7 FM) in Bunkerville, Nevada, which held the call sign KHIJ from 2008 to 2011

== See also ==
- Kalateh Khij, a town in Iran
