= Gilak =

Gilak may refer to:

- Gilaks, an Iranian ethnic group
- Gilak language, a member of the northwestern Iranian language branch

== See also ==
- Gilyak (disambiguation)
- Gilan (disambiguation)
- Gilaki (disambiguation)
- Gilani (disambiguation)
