= Turanid race =

Outdated grouping of human beings

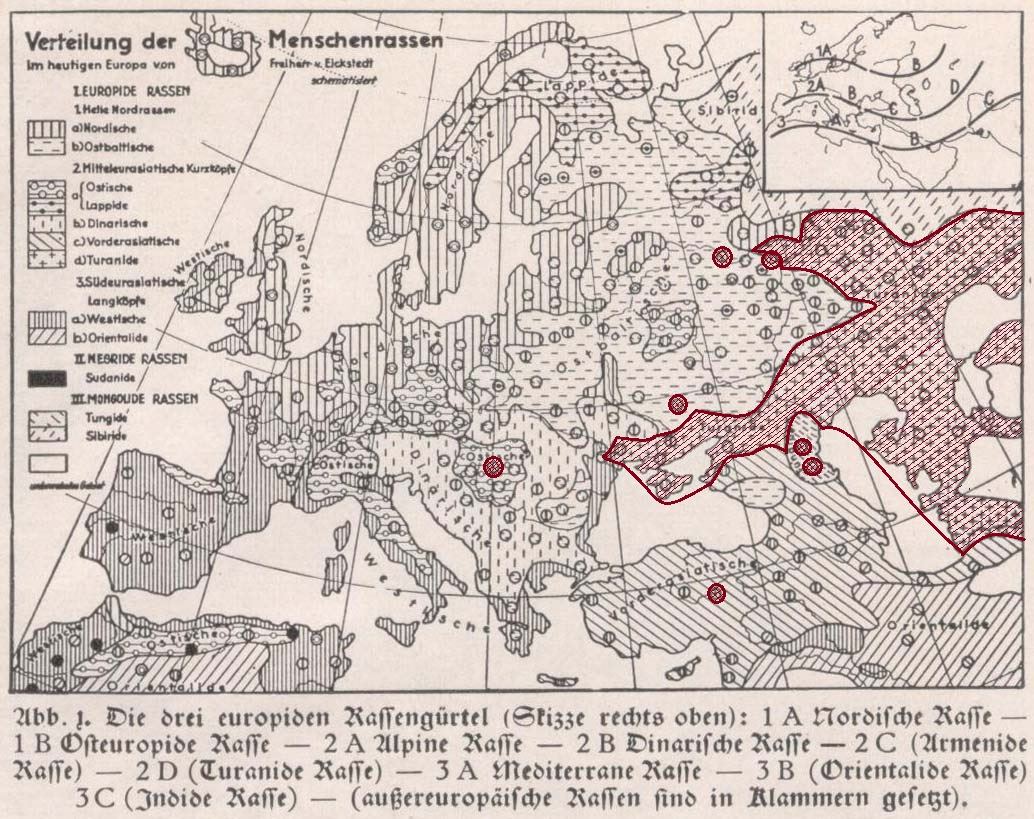
German ethnographic or racial map (c. 1889–1901) showing the supposed extent of the Turanid race in Europe

The Turanid race was a supposed sub-race of the Caucasian race in the context of a now-outdated model of dividing humanity into different races. The Turanid type was traditionally held to be most common among the populations native to Central Asia. The name is taken from the obsolete phylum of Turanian languages.

== History ==
Anthropologists of the 19th and early 20th century posited the existence of a Turanid racial type or "minor race" as a subtype of the Caucasoid race with Mongoloid admixture, situated at the boundary of the distribution of the Mongoloid and Caucasoid races.

The idea of a Turanid race came to play a role of some significance in Pan-Turkism or Turanism in the late 19th to 20th century. A "Turkish race" was proposed as a Caucasoid subtype in European literature of the period.

The most influential of these sources were Histoire Générale des Huns, des Turcs, des Mongols, et autres Tartares Occidentaux (1756–1758) by Joseph de Guignes (1721–1800), and Sketches of Central Asia (1867) by Ármin Vámbéry, which was on the common origins of Turkic groups as belonging to one race, but subdivided according to physical traits and customs, and L'histoire de l'Asie (1896) by Leon Cahun, which stressed the role of Turks in "carrying civilization to Europe", as a part of the greater "Turanid race" that included the Uralic and Altaic speaking peoples more generally. There was also an ideology of Hungarian Turanism most lively in the second half of the 19th century and in the first half of the 20th century.

== See also ==
- Irano-Afghan race
- Caspian race
