= Kija =

Kija or Gija may refer to:

- Jizi, known in Korean as Kija or Gija, a semi-legendary figure and founder of the Gija Joseon of ancient Korea
- Gija people (or Kija), an ethnic group of Australia
- Kija language, their language
- Queen Kiya of ancient Egypt, also spelled Kija

== See also ==
- Khija
