= Nowruz Khani =

Tabari Gilani tradition

Nowruz Khani, or singing for Nowruz, is a Tabari Gilani tradition in which in the latest days of the year before the Persian New Year (Nowrooz), people go at the door of their neighbors and sing songs about the impending coming of the spring. According to this tradition, people hold lanterns and pay visit to all the houses in their neighborhood, while clattering two piece of wood together. When they come at a door they take permission for Nowruz Khani by singing: "O my sire, first I say you hail, O good-thought person, grant us an opportunity to sing some words to you". And if they get permission, which is usually the case except when the household visited is mourning for a deceased person or facing other extenuating circumstances, they sing songs eulogizing the Imams of Shiite Muslims. In return, they will be given a gift such as money, rice, or eggs.

Usually Nowruz Khans or singers give a green stick of "shamshad" tree as a symbol for fortune to the household, and if they are not at home, put it in the porch of the house.
