= Gilaki =

Gilaki may possibly refer to:

- Gilaks, an adjective for an ethnic group in Iran province of Gilan
- Gilaki language, a language spoken by a group of Gilani people in Iran's Gīlān Province

== See also ==
- Gilak (disambiguation)
- Gilan (disambiguation)
- Jilan (disambiguation)
- Gilani (disambiguation), linked to or from Gilan
- Gilaki and Mazandarani (disambiguation)
