= Dandelions Girl =

Iranian Short film by Azadeh Masihzadeh 2025

- film poster
- Persian: دختر قاصدک‌ها
- Directed by: Azadeh Masihzadeh
- Written by: Azadeh Masihzadeh
- Produced by: Raziyeh Gholami
- Starring: Tara Soroush; Benyam Afrangeh; Abdollah Bahadori; Hirad Rostami
- Cinematography: Abolfazl Nabati
- Edited by: Hamid Najafirad
- Music by: Ali Gorgin
- Release date: 2025
- Running time: 19 minutes
- Country: Iran
- Language: Gilaki

Dandelions Girl is a short Iranian drama film, written and directed by Azadeh Masihzadeh, released in 2025.

== Plot ==
Set in the lush green landscape of northern Iran, 11-year-old Roja dreams of playing soccer. When she convinces the boys to let her join, her natural talent as a goalkeeper soon shines through.

== Accolades ==
| Festival | Date of ceremony | Award/Category | Recipient(s) | Result | Ref. |
|---|---|---|---|---|---|
| SIFFCY (Note: Smile International Film Festival for Children & Youth, India) | Feb 3, 2025 | Young Jury Award | Dandelions Girl | Won | |
| SSFF & ASIA (Note: Short Shorts Film Festival & Asia) | Jun 30, 2025 | Live-action Competition Asia International | Dandelions Girl | Won | |
| Ennesimo Film Festival | May 4, 2025 | Fuorifuoco (Note: The Fuorifuoco (Offside) Prize honors the best short film about football, selected by a jury of local football players.) | Dandelions Girl | Won | |
| Kinolub Film Festival | Jun 30, 2025 | Konfrontacje | Dandelions Girl | selected | |
| ICFF (Note: 8th Aryan International Children’s Film Festival of Jaipur) | Aug 29, 2025 | International short film | Dandelions Girl | Top 2nd | |
| DISFF48 (Note: Drama International Short Film Festival 48) | Sep 14, 2025 | KIDDO (Note: The KIDDO section is dedicated to films that deal with children’s and adolescents’ themes.) | Dandelions Girl | selected | |
| SICFF (Note: 13th Seoul International Children's film Festival) | Sep 16, 2025 | Audience Award/International Short Films | Dandelions Girl | selected | |
| 45th Paladino d’Oro SportFilmFestival Palermo | Dec 7, 2025 | football | Dandelions Girl | Finalist | |

== See also ==
- Cinema of Iran
