= Kilan Adawand =

Kilan Adawand was the name of a royal Gilite clan roaming in Khankha, Gilan. The most prominent members of the clan were; Hindu and Khashuya, the sons of Umkar, Ismail ibn Mardujin, Sarijin ibn Jilyar, and Mastar ibn Filmard.

== Sources ==
- Madelung, W. (1967), Abu Ishaq al-Sabi on the Alids of Tabaristan and Gilan, Cambridge: The University of Chicago Press, pp. 1–57, ISBN 978-0-521-20093-6, JSTOR 543520
