= Tabrian =

Tabrian or Tabariyan or Tabryan (Persian: تبريان) may refer to:

- Tabrian, Faruj, a village in North Khorasan Province, Iran
- Tabarian, Shirvan, a village in North Khorasan Province, Iran
- Tabari people, a people in the north of Iran
- Tabari language or Mazanderani, spoken mainly in Iran's Mazandaran, Tehran and Golestan provinces

== See also ==
- Tabaristan, the area of modern-day Mazanderan and Gilan during the Arab conquest of Iran
- Gilaki and Mazandarani (disambiguation)
- Mazanderani (disambiguation)
