= Fauzia Gailani =

Afghan politician (born 1971)

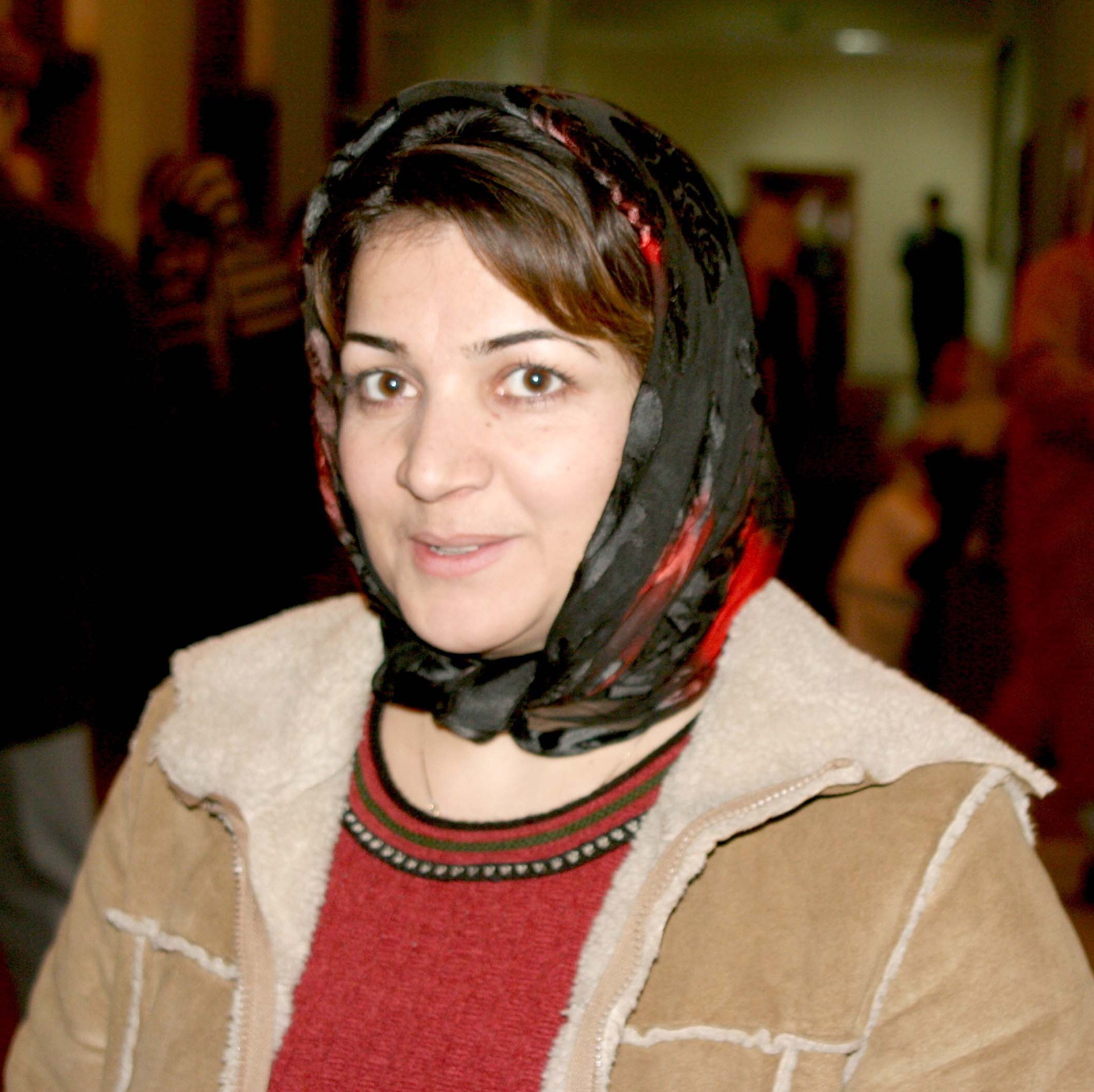

Member of the Wolesi Jirga
- In office 2005–unknown
- Constituency: Herat Province

Personal details
- Born: 1971 (age 54–55)
- Occupation: Legislator

Fauzia Gailani is an Afghan politician. She was elected to represent Herat Province in Afghanistan's Wolesi Jirga, the lower house of its National Legislature, in 2005. She won almost 16,885 votes, more than any other candidate in Herat.

Prior to her election Fauzia, a mother of six, had established a chain of fitness centers. She belongs to the Gailani ethnic Pashtun family of Afghanistan. Fauzia has spoken out against violence against women, and has spoken out against forced marriages for girls. She herself was forced to marry, at thirteen years of age. She was widely quoted following the murder of Nadia Anjuman, a young Afghan poet whose husband was arrested for her death after admitting hitting her following an argument.

The Congressional Research Service described Fauzia as one of the independent representatives whose support the Hamid Karzai administration was struggling to win.
