= Gorgani language =

Extinct language of northern Iran

Gorgani
- Gurgani
- گوراڤانی
- Region: Gorgan
- Ethnicity: Semnani
- Extinct: 16th-18th centuries
- Language family: Indo-European: Indo-Iranian; Iranian; Western Iranian; Caspian; Gorgani

Language codes
- ISO 639-3: None (mis)
- Glottolog: gurg1241

Gorgani or Gurgani is the extinct language of the city of Gorgan in northern Iran, neighboring Mazanderani. It is documented from the 14th and 15th centuries, from the writings of the Horufi movement.

== Classification ==
Glottolog classifies Gorgani within the Caspian subgroup of Iranian languages, along with Mazanderani and Gilaki.

== Surviving Texts ==
All surviving texts are from Horufi movement, which wrote also in Persian and Turkish.

- Jāvidān-nāma (“The Eternal Book”)
- Nawm-nāma (“Book of Dreams”)
- Muḥabbat-nāma (“Book of Affection”)
- Maḥram-nāma (“Book of the Confidant”)
- Lughat-i astarābādi (“Glossary of Astarābādi”)

== Phonology ==
The phoneme /č/ occurs in the initial position only. /ž/ appears commonly in Gorgani, derived from the Old Iranian medial *-č-. /j/ is not used to a great extent, and is used seemingly interchangeably with /ž/ (e.g. jinda vs žinda - “alive”).
