= Nivkh =

Nivkh or Amuric or Gilyak may refer to:

- Nivkh people (Nivkhs) or Gilyak people (Gilyaks)
- Nivkh languages or Gilyak languages
- Gilyak class gunboat, such as the second Russian gunboat Korietz

== See also ==
- Gilak (disambiguation)
