= Kalateh Hay-ye Gharbi Rural District =

Rural district in Semnan province, Iran

Kalateh Hay-ye Gharbi Rural District Persian: دهستان كلاته هائ غربي
- Rural District
- Location within Iran
- Coordinates: 36°40′N 55°23′E
- Country: Iran
- Province: Semnan
- County: Shahrud
- District: Bastam
- Established: 1987
- Capital: Khij

Population (2016)
  - Total: 4,983
- Time zone: UTC+3:30 (IRST)

Kalateh Hay-ye Gharbi Rural District (Persian: دهستان كلاته هائ غربي) is in Bastam District of Shahrud County, Semnan province, Iran. Its capital is the village of Khij. The rural district was previously administered from the city of Kalateh-ye Khij.

== Demographics ==
=== Population ===
At the time of the 2006 National Census, the rural district's population was 3,456 in 976 households. There were 4,568 inhabitants in 1,076 households at the following census of 2011. The 2016 census measured the population of the rural district as 4,983 in 1,215 households. The most populous of its 49 villages was Padegan-e Chehel Dokhtar, with 1,902 people.

=== Other villages in the rural district ===
- Jilan
- Mazaj
