= Mazaj =

Village in Semnan province, Iran

Mazaj Persian: مزج
- Village
- Location within Iran
- Coordinates: 36°36′37″N 55°24′12″E
- Country: Iran
- Province: Semnan
- County: Shahrud
- District: Bastam
- Rural District: Kalateh Hay-ye Gharbi

Population (2016)
  - Total: 649
- Time zone: UTC+3:30 (IRST)

Mazaj (Persian: مزج) (Note: Also romanized as Mazj; also known as Magās, Maghāzu, and Maghz) is a village in Kalateh Hay-ye Gharbi Rural District of Bastam District in Shahrud County, Semnan province, Iran.

== Demographics ==
=== Population ===
At the time of the 2006 National Census, the village's population was 666 in 215 households. The following census in 2011 counted 580 people in 195 households. The 2016 census measured the population of the village as 649 people in 208 households.
