= Galeshi =

Dialect of Gilaki language

- Deylami
- گالشي (Galeši)
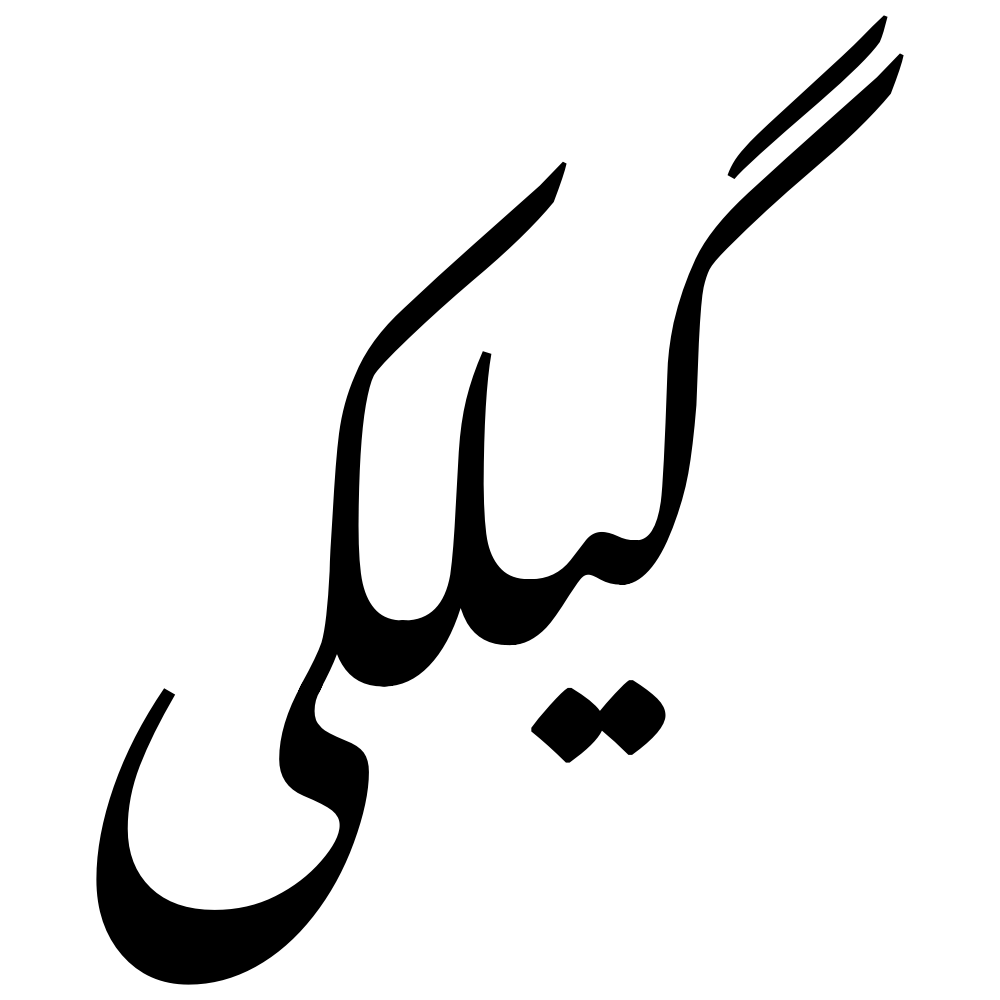
- Gilaki in Nastaliq style (گیلکی)
- Native speakers: (undated figure of 2,000)
- Language family: Indo-European: Indo-Iranian; Iranian; Western Iranian; Northwestern Iranian; Caspian; Gilaki; Galeshi

Language codes
- ISO 639-3: –
- Glottolog: rudb1238
- Linguasphere: 58-AAC-eb

Map depicting areas where Galeshi is spoken

Galeshi, Rudbari or Deylami is a dialect of the Gilaki language spoken in the mountains of southern and south-eastern Gilan and western Mazandaran.

== Distribution ==
This dialect is spoken in the foothills and mountainous areas south and southeast of Gilan, including Rudbar, Rostamabad, Siahkal and Deylaman, Amlash, Rahimabad, Ashkorat, and also in the west of Mazandaran such as Ramsar and Tonekabon.

== Status ==
Due to the fact that the Galesh lived in remote areas and generally had less contact with the people of the plains and human settlements, their dialect has remained intact. Therefore, Galeshi Gilaki is more authentic than Gilaki in urban areas. Regardless, the Gilaki dialect of the Galesh is very similar to the dialect of the people of East Gilan and West Mazandaran, except for Lahijan.

== Grammar ==
=== Pronouns ===
In the Galashi dialect, pronouns have three cases: active, passive and possessive.

| Identification | Singular 1 | Singular 2 | Singular 3 | Plural 1 | Plural 2 | Plural 3 |
|---|---|---|---|---|---|---|
| Active, Galeshi | mo | to | on | amә | šәmә | išan |
| Passive, Galeshi | mәrә | tәrә | onә | amәrә | šәmәrә | ošanә |
| Possessive, Galeshi | mi ši | ti ši | onә ši | ami ši | šimi ši | ošanә ši |
