= Caspian =

Caspian can refer to:

- The Caspian Sea
- The Caspian Depression, surrounding the northern part of the Caspian Sea
- The Caspians, the ancient people living near the Caspian Sea
- The Caspian languages spoken in northern Iran and southeastern Azerbaijan
- The Northeast Caucasian languages, also referred to as 'Caspian languages,' spoken in the Russian Caucasus and northern Azerbaijan

== In fiction ==
- Prince Caspian, a book in the Chronicles of Narnia series by C. S. Lewis
  - Caspian X, "Prince Caspian", a prince of the Telmarines
  - The Chronicles of Narnia: Prince Caspian, a film based on the novel by C. S. Lewis
- Caspian (Highlander), a fictional character on Highlander: The Series
- Judson Caspian, alter-ego of one of three characters named the Reaper (DC Comics)
- Caspian Keyes, a main character in Pantheon

== Other uses ==
- Caspian cobra, a species of snake endemic to Central Asia
- Caspian horse, a small horse breed native to Northern Iran
- Caspian tiger, a Panthera tigris population native Northern Iran and Caucasus
- Caspian Airlines, an airline based in Tehran, Iran
- Caspian (band), an instrumental post-rock band
- Caspian, Michigan, a small city in the United States
- USS Caspian (ID-1380), proposed designation for a tug that never actually served in the United States Navy
