= Dezhan =

Dezhan دژن
- Village
- Location within Iran
- Coordinates: 35°03′46″N 46°38′28″E
- Country: Iran
- Province: Kurdistan
- County: Kamyaran
- Bakhsh: Central
- Rural District: Zhavehrud

Population (2006)
  - Total: 596
- Time zone: UTC+3:30 (IRST)
  - Summer (DST): UTC+4:30 (IRDT)

Dezhan (Persian: دژن, also Romanized as Dazhan and Dezhen; also known as Gīlān) is a village in Zhavehrud Rural District, in the Central District of Kamyaran County, Kurdistan Province, Iran. At the 2006 census, its population was 596, in 142 families. The village is mostly populated by Kurds.
