= Abulfattah Al-Zoubi =

Muslim jurist and writer

Abulfattah bin Mohammad Badr al-Din al-Zoubi al-Jilani
- Born: 1840 AD; Tripoli (Lebanon)
- Died: 1935 AD
- Occupations: Writer, scholar, Jurist

Abulfattah bin Mohammad Badr al-Din al-Zoubi al-Jilani (Arabic title: عبدالفتاح بن محمد بدر الدين الزعبي الجيلاني), was a Muslim jurist and writer. He was born in the city of Tripoli (Northern Lebanon), and died there.

== His life ==
Abdulfattah Al-Zoubi was born in 1259 AH / 1840 AD in Tripoli, and received his education there, where he studied jurisprudence and literature from the great scholars of his time. When he grew up, he took over the Zawiya of Al-Zoubiyyah in the locality of Al-Suwayqa in Tripoli. He also took over the positions of public speaking, teaching and imams in the Great Mansouri Mosque. Later on, the Ottoman Empire appointed him as a representative for the honorable people of the city of Tripoli and allocated him a monthly salary for his knowledge, religion and remarkable impact. He had a loud voice and was quick-witted. His arguments were compelling, and he had extensive knowledge in genealogy. He left a manuscript he called "The Genealogy of the Tripoli Families" (Arabic title: Ansab A'elat Tarablous), his mosque sermons he used to give in the Great Mansouri Mosque and in its zawiya were collected in a printed book called "The book of sermons" (Arabic title: Al-Moawa’et al-Hamidiyya). The houses of entertainment, gambling, and others were widespread in his days, and young people desired to go to them while they ignored Dhikr councils. Sheikh Al-Zoubi, as a result, decided to face them and urged the people of Tripoli to avoid them. He urged them to attend the dhikr circles that he held in the religious corner for worshipping Allah. He also fought the pretenders of Sufism, who used the name Sufi as a slogan to hide their hypocrisy and misguidance, represented by abandoning the religious duties and dissolving from the Islamic Sharia. He urged people to be ascetic in this world and to work for the Hereafter, disparaging the ideas of those who began to deny the dignity of Awleya'. He composed the poem "the Dignity of Dignities" (Arabic title: Karamat Al-Karamat), in which he showed his deep faith in the dignity of Sheikh Muhammad al-Jisr al-Tarabulsi, and recorded his admiration for Sheikh Hussein al-Jisr, the collector of his father's dignity and his good virtues. And this remained his habit, preaching to people, directing and instructing, urging obedience to God and forbidding them from bad deeds and evils, and showing them the path of salvation in this world and the Hereafter, until he died in 1935 AD / 1354 AH.

== His works ==
Sheikh Abd al-Fattah al-Zoubi left a number of poetic compositions, most of which were about religious educational poetry, as well as lamentation and praise of the sheikhs of Naqshbandi and Qadiriyah.

- (Arabic title: Urjoza Al-Adaab al-Murdeya fi Al-Tariqa Al-Naqshbandeyya Al-Khaledeyya, 1305 AH).
- (Arabic title: Al-Eejaz fi Madh Sayyidina Al-Baz
- A Composition in the Names of Allah. Literary Press, Beirut, 1315 AH.
- A Composition in the Names of the Adnani Prophet.
- (Arabic title: Al-Mawaed Al-Hameedeyya).
- Blessed Group
- Genealogy of Tripoli Families (in manuscript)
