= Yilan =

Yilan may refer to:

== China ==
- Yilan County, Heilongjiang (依兰县), county of central Heilongjiang province, People's Republic of China
- Yilan Town, Heilongjiang (依兰镇), seat of Yilan County
- Yilan, Jilin (依兰镇), town in Yanji

== Taiwan ==
- Yilan County, Taiwan (宜蘭縣), county in northeastern Taiwan
  - Yilan County Constituency, a constituency in the Legislative Yuan since 2008
  - Yilan County Council
- Yilan City (宜蘭市), seat of Yilan County
- Yilan River (宜蘭河), river flowing through Yilan County

== Turkey ==
- Yılankale, crusader castle
- Yılan Island, Mediterranean island in Turkey
