= List of people from Gilan =

These people have been born, died or have spent time in Gilan province, Iran as residence.

- Abdul-Qadir Gilani, 12th century founder of the Qadiri order of Sunni Islam
- Mohammad Ali Mojtahedi Gilani
- Ardeshir Mohassess
- Arsen Minasian
- Hazin Lahiji
- Mirza Kouchak Khan Jangali, Soviet Republic of Gilan 1920-1921
- Mohammad Taghi Bahjat Foumani
- Al-Jilani
- Mahmoud Behzad
- Majid Samii
- Pejman Nouri
- Mohammad Moin
- Sirous Ghayeghran
- Ghafour Jahani
- Hushang Ebtehaj
- Mardavij
- Shams Langeroodi
- Ebrahim Nabavi
- Roozbeh Mirebrahimi
- Fazlollah Reza
- Enayatollah Reza
- Akbar Radi
- Hooshang Amirahmadi
- Morteza Mehrzad
