= Kalateh-ye Khij =

City in Semnan province, Iran

Kalateh-ye Khij Persian: كلاته خيج
- City
- Location within Iran
- Coordinates: 36°40′23″N 55°17′49″E
- Country: Iran
- Province: Semnan
- County: Shahrud
- District: Bastam
- Established as a city: 1993

Population (2016)
  - Total: 5,651
- Time zone: UTC+3:30 (IRST)

Kalateh-ye Khij (Persian: كلاته خيج) (Note: Also romanized as Kalāteh Khīj, Kalāteh-i-Khīj, and Kalāteh-ye Khīj; also known as Kalāteh Khonj) is a city in Bastam District of Shahrud County, Semnan province, Iran. It was the administrative center for Kalateh Hay-ye Gharbi Rural District until its capital was transferred to the village of Khij. The village of Kalateh-ye Khij was converted to a city in 1993.

== Demographics ==
=== Population ===
At the time of the 2006 National Census, the city's population was 5,335 in 1,447 households. The following census in 2011 counted 5,057 people in 1,536 households. The 2016 census measured the population of the city as 5,651 people in 1,802 households.
