= Eastern Gilaki =

Gilaki dialect of Iran

Bie Pish Gilaki
- Eastern Gilaki
- بيه پيشي گيلکي (Bie Piši Gilөki)
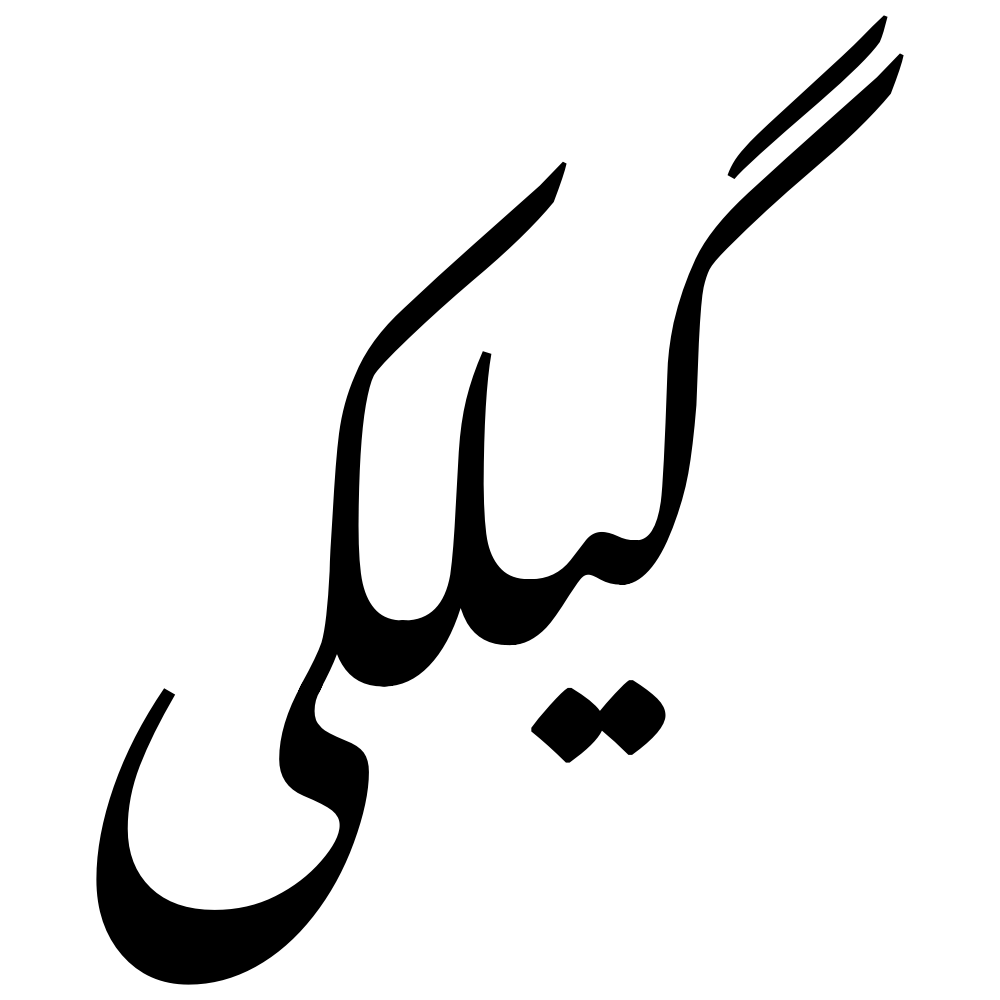
- Gilaki in Nastaliq style (گیلکی)
- Native to: Iran
- Language family: Indo-European: Indo-Iranian; Iranian; Western Iranian; Northwestern Iranian; Caspian; Gilaki; Bie Pish Gilaki

Language codes
- ISO 639-3: glk
- Glottolog: east2843
- Linguasphere: 58-AAC-eb

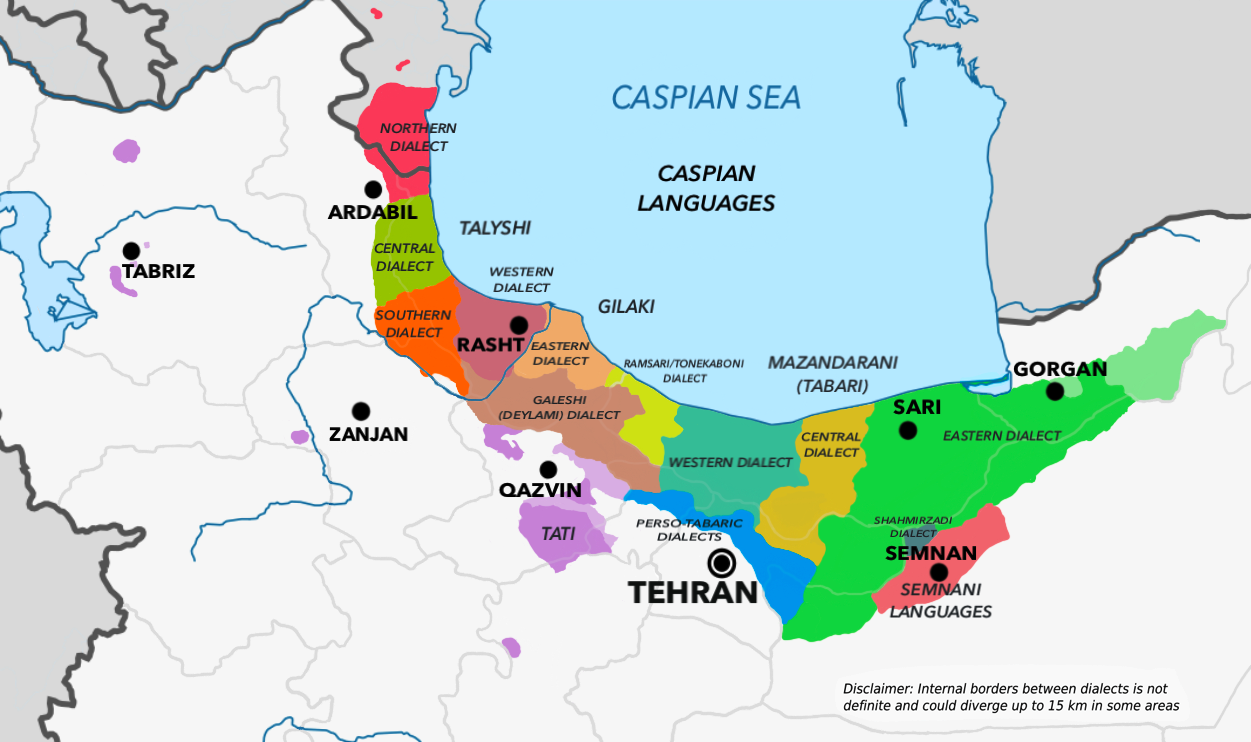
Map depicting areas where Eastern Gilaki (including Ramsari/Tonekaboni) is spoken

Eastern or Bie Pish Gilaki is a dialect of the Gilaki language spoken in the eastern portion of Gilan and western Mazandaran, Iran.
