= Nezam al-Din Ahmad Gilani =

Iranian philosopher and physician

Nezam al-Din Ahmad Gilani (1585 – after 1662; Persian: نظام‌الدین احمد گیلانی), also known by his honorific title of Hakim al-Molk (حکیم الملک), was an Iranian philosopher and physician from Gilan, who served the Qutb Shahi rulers in the Indian region of Deccan.

Nezam al-Din Ahmad was born in 1585 to a family native to Gilan, a region and Safavid province on the Caspian coast of northern Iran. The family were from the village of Moridan, close to the village of Malat, which had originally served as the headquarters of the Kar-Kiya dynasty (1370s–1592) of Biya-pish (eastern Gilan). Nezam al-Din Ahmad was the son of Ali, a physician who was the son of a certain Hasan. Nezam al-Din Ahmad may have been the great-grandson of a namesake astrologer and geomancer from Gilan, who went to the city of Herat, then ruled by the Timurid Sultan Husayn Bayqara (r. 1469–1506). Even during his stay in the Deccan, Nezam al-Din Ahmad was still in close contacts with people from his village as other Gilani scholars in the Deccan.

== Sources ==
- Bandy, Hunter (2021). "Neẓām-al-Din Aḥmad Gilāni". In Yarshater, Ehsan (ed.). Encyclopædia Iranica (Online ed.). Encyclopædia Iranica Foundation.
