= Gilan, Khuzestan =

Gilan گيلان
- Village
- Location within Iran
- Coordinates: 32°01′32″N 49°52′38″E
- Country: Iran
- Province: Khuzestan
- County: Izeh
- Bakhsh: Susan
- Rural District: Susan-e Gharbi

Population (2006)
  - Total: 165
- Time zone: UTC+3:30 (IRST)
  - Summer (DST): UTC+4:30 (IRDT)

Gilan (Persian: گيلان, also Romanized as Gīlān; also known as Gilan Mal Viran) is a village in Susan-e Gharbi Rural District, Susan District, Izeh County, Khuzestan Province, Iran. At the 2006 census, its population was 165, in 29 families.
