= Kamel Keilany =

Egyptian writer

Kamal Keilany (Arabic: كامل كيلاني; 1897–1959) was an Egyptian writer. He was born in Al Qala'a district in Cairo, Egypt.
