= Haji Gilani =

Haji Gilani was the first person to give Hamid Karzai shelter in the province of Uruzgan, Afghanistan as Karzai launched his anti-Taliban revolt weeks before the religious militia collapsed under heavy U.S. bombing in late 2001.

Gilani and his nephew were shot dead on April 3, 2003 by six gunmen. While initial reports speculated that former Taliban operatives were responsible, a spokesperson for Karzai suggested that a tribal feud may have been the motive.
