= Faleh Al-Kilani =

Iraqi writer and scholar

- Born: 1944 (age 81–82)
- Occupations: poet, writer, author
- Known for: Al-mojis in Arabic Poetry (book)

Faleh Nassif Al-Hajiyah Al-Kilani (Arabic:فالح الكيلاني) is an Iraqi scholar, poet, and writer.

== Lineage ==
He is Faleh bin Nassif bin Jassim bin Ahmed al-Hajiya bin Abdul Karim bin Abdul Rahim bin Khamis bin Wali al-Din al-Qadri bin Othman bin Yahya bin Hussam al-Din al-Kilani al-Naqib bin Nur al-Din bin Wli al-Din bin Zain al-Din al-Qadiri bin Sharaf al-Din Ibn Shams al-Din Muhammad Ibn Nur al-Din Ali bin Izz al-Din Hussain Ibn Shams al-Din Muhammad al-Akhal bin Husam al-Din Sharshaiq Ibn Jamal al-Din Muhammad al-Hattak Ibn Abd al-Aziz Ibn al-Sheikh Abd al-Qadir al-Jilani Ibn Musa III Ibn Abdullah al-Jaili Ibn Yahya al-Zahid Bin Muhammad Al-Madani Bin Dawud, Prince of Mecca, Ibn Musa Al-Thani Bin Abdullah Al-Saleh Bin Musa Al-Jun Bin Abdullah Al-Mahd Bin Al-Hassan Al-Muthanna Bin Al-Hassan Al-Mujtaba Bin Ali Bin Abi Talib.

== Biography ==
A well-known poet, born in Diyala 1363 AH / 1944 AD, and from the Kilani family, which is a family with a long history and goes back to Wali al-Din al-Qadri, grandson of Abd al-Qadir al-Jilani al-Hasani. The Kilani family gave birth to many prominent figures throughout the ages. He held the position of director in the Ministry Iraqi Education until his retirement in 2001 AD. One of his most important books is "Al Moujis in the Arab Poetry. It is considered one of the references of Arabic books in literature and poetry through the ages and times, and one of the most important objective historical encyclopedias in Arabic poetry in modern and contemporary history with all its vocabulary, events, developments, arts and changes, including the column of poetry, free poetry, prose poem, poets, their classes and their conditions. The book was printed two editions, the first by Shawqi Dhaif in 1970 in one volume, and the second in 865 pages in four parts in two large volumes by Dar Dijla, Amman – Jordan. Dr. Faleh Al-Kilani says in the same introduction, "But I think that poetry, in this age, still has its danger, and that the poet, as it was from ancient times, is still a prophet among people, guiding and leading them, and straightening what is wrong from their character and tastes .. And this poetry is sufficient, so there is no need." With it until it is a trumpet of social reform, aimed directly at serving the country, it will not be poetry at that time, and we will not have the right to consider it a beautiful art.

Some of his poems have been translated into English, French, Spanish, Persian and German.

He published many books, articles, poems and research on literary criticism, language, history and art in a number of Arab magazines, including:

- The Journal of Islamic Awareness in Kuwait.
- Society magazine in Beirut.
- AlAqlam magazine in Beirut.
- The Islamic Message Magazine in Baghdad.
- Journal of Islamic Education in Baghdad.

== Memberships and honors ==
- Honored with the title of "Best Influential Cultural Personality" for the year 2017 by the International Cultural Leading Word Organization.

== Poetry collection ==
- Shinning splendour

== Poetic art ==
Al-Kilani is considered one of the poets of the neo-modernist vertical poem that celebrates writing free of gaps through verbal, rhythmic and semantic austerity and its interest in the aesthetics of knowledge and the question of modernity. Which activates the modernist sense in the poem with all its arts and its benefit from the data of modern Arabic poetry as well as activating the poetic rhythm of the rhythm of the well-known Arabic poetry and activating the poetry of the rhyme and its aesthetics to place it in an artistic context that justifies its survival in the contemporary poetic text despite its openness and its elimination of any formal requirements that some see hinder its artistic movement weakens his aspirations to explore the far reaches of the modern poetic text.

== His books ==
1. Encyclopedia of Arab Poets in ten volumes, printed and published by the Tigris House in Amman, Jordan.

== Contribution ==
The poet wrote many articles and magazines in Iraqi and Arab newspapers, as well as his participation in many literary festivals, such as the annual Al-Marbad festival in Iraq from 1983 to 2002, and the Arab Historians Union Festival in 1997 AD. and all the seminars and festivals held in Diyala, whether Arab, Iraqi or local. He has more than a thousand published articles, and he has relations and friendships with many Arab and Iraqi writers and poets, including the writer Yusef Ezz al-Din al-Samarrai, the well-known Palestinian poet Mahmoud Darwish, the Libyan poet Muhammad Miftah al-Fitori, the poet Nizar Qabbani, the Iraqi poet Sargon Bollos, the poet Raad Bandar, the poet Walid al-Azami, Also the writers and historians professors like Imad Abdel Salam Raouf, Salem Al-Alousi, Abdel-Rahman Majeed Al-Rubaie, Hussein Ali Mahfouz, Jalal Al-Hanafi, Shawky Dhaif, and others.

The poet holds many certificates of appreciation from the Iraqi Scientific Academy, the Ministry of Culture, the General Union of Arab Writers and the Union of Arab Historians, and others.
