= Jilan, Iran =

Village in Semnan province, Iran

Jilan Persian: جيلان
- Village
- Location within Iran
- Coordinates: 36°35′42″N 55°32′28″E
- Country: Iran
- Province: Semnan
- County: Shahrud
- District: Bastam
- Rural District: Kalateh Hay-ye Gharbi

Population (2016)
  - Total: 773
- Time zone: UTC+3:30 (IRST)

Jilan (Persian: جيلان) (Note: Also romanized as Jīlān; also known as Gīlān) is a village in Kalateh Hay-ye Gharbi Rural District of Bastam District in Shahrud County, Semnan province, Iran.

== Demographics ==
=== Population ===
At the time of the 2006 National Census, the village's population was 698 in 178 households. The following census in 2011 counted 626 people in 203 households. The 2016 census measured the population of the village as 773 people in 286 households.
