= Khij, Semnan =

Village in Semnan province, Iran

Khij Persian: خيج
- Village
- Location within Iran
- Coordinates: 36°40′06″N 55°19′21″E
- Country: Iran
- Province: Semnan
- County: Shahrud
- District: Bastam
- Rural District: Kalateh Hay-ye Gharbi

Population (2016)
  - Total: 1,582
- Time zone: UTC+3:30 (IRST)

Khij (Persian: خيج) (Note: Also romanized as Khīj; also known as Khīja) is a village in, and the capital of, Kalateh Hay-ye Gharbi Rural District of Bastam District, Shahrud County, Semnan province, Iran. The rural district was previously administered from the city of Kalateh-ye Khij.

== Demographics ==
=== Population ===
At the time of the 2006 National Census, the village's population was 1,591 in 447 households. The following census in 2011 counted 2,852 people in 528 households. The 2016 census measured the population of the village as 1,582 people in 546 households.
