= Caspian race =

Obsolete race concept

The Caspian race was a supposed sub-race of the Caucasian race in the context of a now-outdated model of dividing humanity into different races which was developed originally by Europeans in support of colonialism. The term was used by M. G. Abdushelishvili (1979) as constituting a branch of the Mediterranean race or Irano-Afghan race. In Soviet-era anthropology, the term was used to include Tats and Azerbaijanis.

The Caspian race was said to be prevalent among the Azerbaijanis, Kumyks and Tsakhurs. Genrietta Leonidovna Khit said that as a form of racial admixture the Caspian subtype was represented among Turkmens and Talyshs.
