= Mazanderani language =

Northwestern Iranian language

Mazandarani
- مازِرونی Mazeruni تَبَری Tabari
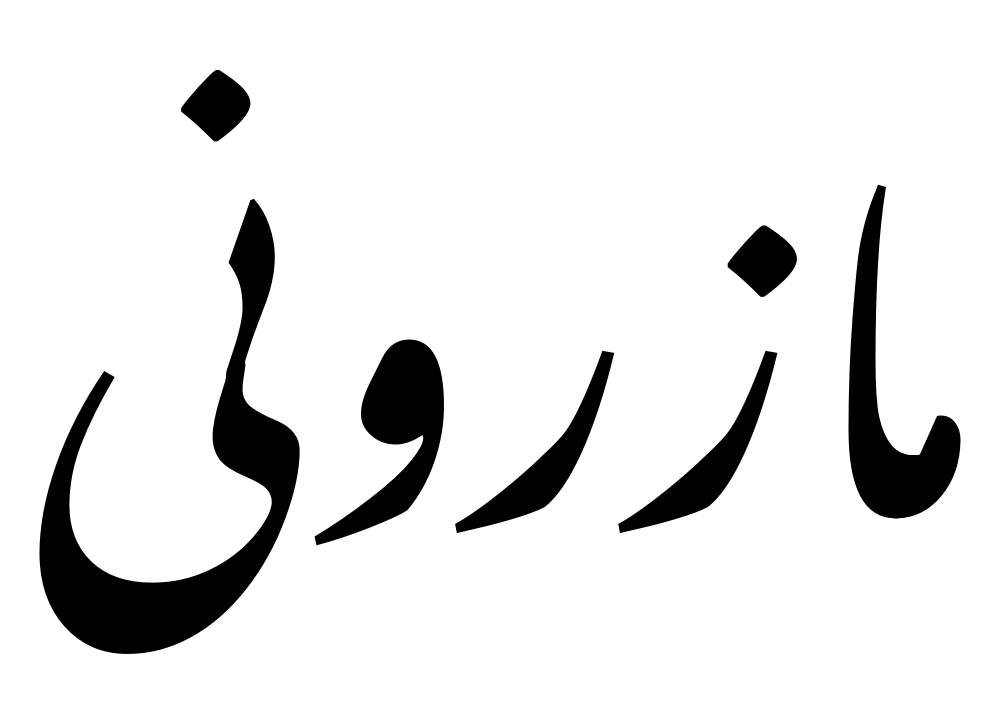
- Mazanderani (Mazeruni) written in Nastaliq script. (مازِرونی)
- Native to: Iran (Province of Mazandaran and parts of the provinces of Alborz, Tehran, Qazvin, Semnan and Golestan)
- Region: South coast of the Caspian Sea
- Ethnicity: Mazanderanis
- Native speakers: 1.35 million (2023)
- Language family: Indo-European: Indo-Iranian; Iranian; Western Iranian; Northwestern; Caspian; Mazanderani-Shahmirzadi; Mazandarani
- Dialects: Gorgani-Mazandarani (East); Katuli-Mazandarani (East); Tabari-Mazandarani (Center); Kojuri-Mazandarani (West); Kelarestaqi-Mazandarani (West); Gilaki-Mazandarani (West); Galeshi-Mazandarani (South); Taleqani-Mazandarani (South); Shahmirzadi (South); Ilikaei (South); Qasrani (South)
- Writing system: Persian alphabet

Official status
- Regulated by: None the Linguistic faculty of Mazandaran University officially gathers materials and resources about the language

Language codes
- ISO 639-3: Either: mzn – Mazandarani srz – Shahmirzadi
- Glottolog: maza1305 Mazanderani–Shahmirzadi cent2360 Central Caspian
- ELP: Shahmirzadi
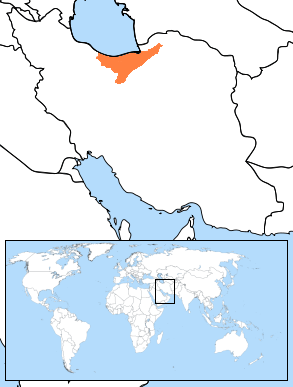
- Areas where Mazandarani is spoken as the mother tongue

Mazanderani (Mazeruni: مازِرونی; also referred to as Mazani (مازنی), Tabari (تبری) or Taveri, Tati, Geleki and Galeshi) is an Iranian language of the Northwestern branch spoken by the Mazanderani people. As of 2023, there were 1.35 million native speakers. As a member of the Northwestern branch (the northern branch of Western Iranian), etymologically speaking, it is rather closely related to Gilaki and also related to Persian, which belongs to the Southwestern branch. Though the Mazani and Persian languages have both influenced each other to a great extent, both are independent languages with different origins in the Iranian plateau.

Mazandarani is closely related to Gilaki, and the two languages have similar vocabularies. The Gilaki and Mazandarani languages (but not other Iranian languages) share certain typological features with Caucasian languages (specifically the non-Indo-European South Caucasian languages), reflecting the history, ethnic identity, and close relatedness to the Caucasus region and Caucasian peoples of Mazandaranis and Gilak people.

== Etymology ==
The name Mazanderani (and variants of it) derives from the name of the province of Mazandaran (Mazerun in Mazanderani), which was part of the historical region of Tapuria. People traditionally call their language Tabari, as the Tabari themselves do. The name Tapuri / Tabari (which was the name of an ancient language spoken somewhere in former Tapuria) is now used in preference to the name Mazandarani by the young. However, both Gilan and Mazanderan formed part of the region known as Tapuria. The earliest references to the language of Mazandaran, called Tabari, are to be found in the works of the early Muslim geographers. Al-Muqaddasī (or Moqaisi, 10th century), for example, notes: "The languages of Komish and Gurgan are similar, they use hā, as in hā-dih and hāk-un, and they are sweet [to the ear], related to them is the language of Tabaristan, [similar] save for its speediness."

== Classification ==
Glottolog classifies Mazandarani (and its dialects) within the Caspian subgroup of Iranian languages, along with Gilaki and Gorgani.

== History ==
Among the living Iranian languages, Mazanderani has one of the longest written traditions, from the tenth to the fifteenth century. This status was achieved during the long reign of the independent and semi-independent rulers of Mazandaran in the centuries after the Arab invasion.

The rich literature of this language includes books such as Marzban Nameh (later translated into Persian) and the poetry of Amir Pazevari. Use of Mazanderani, however, has been in decline for some time. Its literary and administrative prominence had begun to diminish in favor of Persian by the time of the integration of Mazandaran into the national administration in the early seventeenth century.

== Dialects ==
The Mazanderani language is closely related to Gilaki and the two languages have similar vocabularies. In 1993, according to Ethnologue, there were three million native Mazanderani speakers.

The dialects of Mazanderani are as following:

- Saravi: Spoken in Sari County, which includes Chahardangeh District and highlands of Dodangeh District, Miandorud Plains, plains on the west bank of Tajan river, extending west to Juybar.
- Amoli: Encompasses mountainous areas west of Bandpey, as well as Chelav Rural District, Larijan District, Namarestaq and Kelarestaq of Amol, plains of Amol County, Mahmudabad County, foothills and plains of Chamestan region between Amol and Nur.
- Baboli: Spoken in plains of Babol County, Babolsar County, and Fereydunkenar County, highlands of Bandpey extending to Chelav Rural District in west and Alasht to east. Foothills of Babol Kenar and Ganj Afrouz are also included.
- Ghaemshahri: Spoken in plains between Kiakola in west and Juybar in east, villages of Bisheh Sar Rural District, and mountainous areas of Savadkuh and Firuzkuh.
- Chaloos and East Tonekabon: Spoken in Kelar and Langa regions, some villages in foothills of Birun Bashm, coastal plains of Chalus County, Abbasabad County and Nashtarud.
- Nur and Nowshahr: Spoken in Kojur District, Baladeh District, parts of Birun Bashm, and coastal plains between Sorkhrud and Chalus River.
- Shahsavari: Spoken in most of Tonekabon County, which includes Do Hezar, Seh Hezar, Khorramabad District, and plains between Nashtarud and Shirud. In Ramsar County both Mazandarani and Gilaki languages are common.
- Behshahri: Spoken in Plains of Behshahr County, Galugah County and Neka County east of Nekarud, as well as highlands of the mentioned counties (east of Kiasar).
- Kordkuy : Includes Eastern part of Hezar Jarib Region, villages of Ziarat, Shahkuh-e Sofla, Shahkuh-e Olya, Radkan and their neighboring villages, villages from Galugah city in west to Zangian, Golestan in east(excluding settlements populated by Turkmens).
- Katouli: Spoken in rural mountainous areas north of Shahvar peak, villages in the plains of Aliabad-e Katul County, and eastern part of Gorgan County not populated by Turkmens. Aliabad-e Katul, Pichak Mahalleh and Fazelabad, Golestan are among these settlements.
- Ghasrani: Mountains of northern parts of Tehran Province, and west of Jajrud River. Which includes Rudbar-e Qasran District, Fasham, Shemshak, Dizin.
- Damavandi: Spoken in mountainous areas of Damavand County, Rudehen District, and Bumahen District, extending eastward towards Firuzkuh.
- Shahmirzadi

The native people of Aliabad-e Katul, Gorgan, Kordkuy and Bandar-e Gaz in Golestan province are Mazandarani and speak the mazandarani language. The native people of Shemiranat, Damavand and Firuzkuh in Tehran province are Mazandarani and speak the mazandarani language. The native people of north of Karaj and Taleqan in Alborz province are Mazandarani and speak the mazandarani language. The people of east of Alamut in Qazvin province are Mazandarani and speak the mazandarani language. The native of people of Aradan, Garmsar, Shahmirzad and north of Damghan in Semnan province are Mazandarani and speak the mazandarani language. The native people of Galugah, Behshahr, Neka, Sari, Shahi, Babol, Amol, Nowshahr, Chalus, Kelardasht, Abbasabad and Tonekabon in Mazandaran province are Mazanderani people and speak the Mazanderani language.

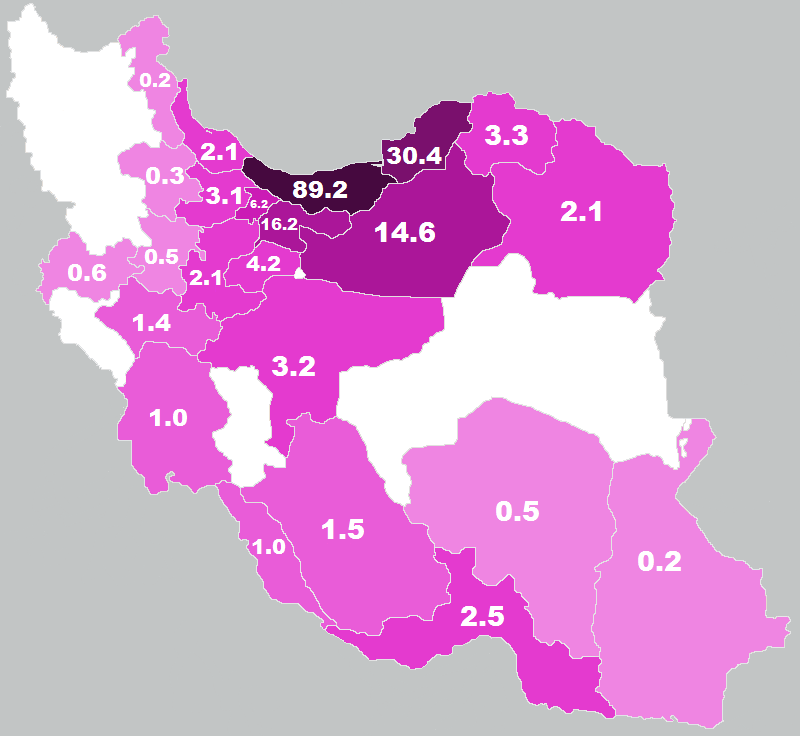
Mazandaranis in Iran

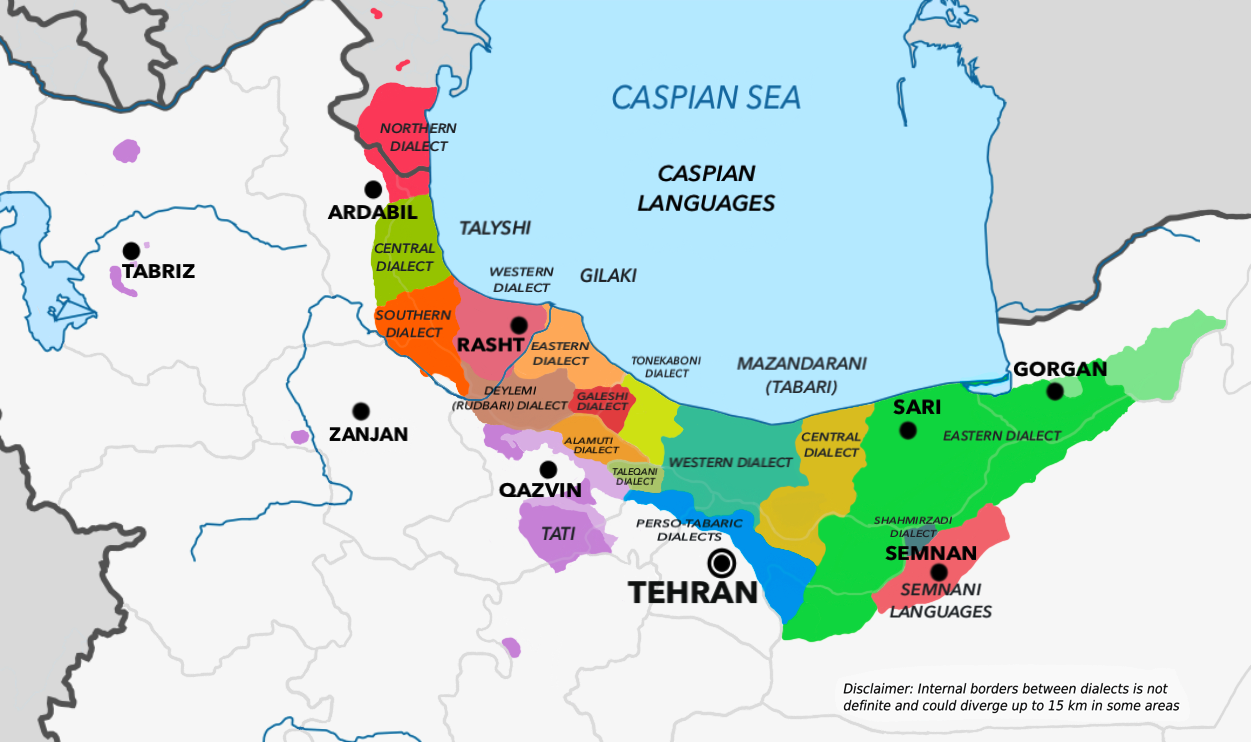
Map depicting areas where the various dialects of Mazandarani are spoken

== Grammar ==
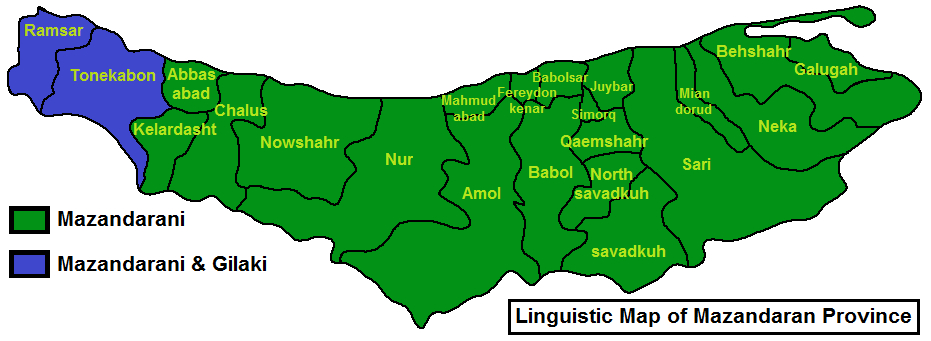
Linguistic Map of Mazandaran Province

Mazanderani is an inflected and genderless language. It is SOV, but in some tenses it may be SVO, depending on the particular dialect involved.

=== Morphology ===
Just as in other modern Iranian languages, there is no distinction between the dative and accusative cases, and the nominative in the sentence takes almost no indicators but may be inferred from word order (depending on dialect it may end in a/o/e). Since Mazanderani lacks articles, there is no inflection for nouns in the sentence (no modifications for nouns). For definition, nouns take the suffix e (me dətere meaning The daughter of mine while me dəter means my daughter). The indefinite article for single nouns is a-tā with tā for determination of number (a-tā kijā meaning a girl). There exist some remnants of old Mazanderani indicating that, in the nominative case, female nouns used to end in a, while male nouns ended in e (as in jənā meaning the woman and mərdē meaning the man). Grammatical gender is still present in certain modern languages closely related to Mazandarani such as Semnani, Sangesari, Zaza and Tati.

Notably, Mazandarani, Gilaki, Zaza, some Tati dialects, Talysh and some Komisenian (Semnani) dialects derive their present stems from the same old Iranian present participle *-ant. The present tense in these languages is formed by adding the present participle to the verb stem, in contrast to the Perside modal prefixes added to the present stem of the verb, e.g. -mi in Persian and -di in Kurdish.

=== Pronouns ===
In the Mazandarani language, independent personal pronouns have three cases: active, passive and possessive.

Identification	Singular 1	Singular 2	Singular 3	Plural 1	Plural 2	Plural 3
Subject (Sari dialect)	mən	tə	və	əmâ	šəmâ	vəšún
Object (Sari dialect)	məre	təre	vəre	əmâre	šəmâre	vəšúnre
Possessive (Sari dialect)	me	te	ve	ame	šeme	vešúne

=== Conjugation ===
Conjugation (hākārden) "to work" in Mazandarani language (Sari dialect).

Tense/person	Sg1	Sg2	Sg3	Pl1	Pl2	Pl3
Preterit	hâkârdeme	hâkârdi	hâkârde	hâkârdemi	hâkârdeni	hâkârdene
Pluperfect	hâkârde-bime	hâkârde-bi	hâkârde-bie	hâkârde-bimi	hâkârde-bini	hâkârde-bine
Past subjunctive	hâkârde-buem	hâkârde-bui	hâkârde-bue	hâkârde-buim	hâkârde-buin	hâkârde-buen
Pluperfect subjunctive	hâkârde-bai-buem	hâkârde-bai-bui	hâkârde-bai-bue	hâkârde-bai-buim	hâkârde-bai-buin	hâkârde-bai-buen
Imperfect (type 1)	kârdeme	kârdi	kârde	kârdemi	kârdeni	kârdene
Imperfect (type 2)	kândesseme	kândessi	kândesse	kândessemi	kândesseni	kândessene
Past progressive (type1)	dai(me)-kârdeme	dai(i)-kârdi	dai(e)-kârde	dai(mi)-kârdemi	dai(ni)-kârdeni	dai(ne)-kârdene
Past progressive (type 2)	dai(me)-kândesseme	dai(i)-kândessi	dai(e)-kândesse	dai(mi)-kândessemi	dai(ni)-kândesseni	dai(ne)-kândessene
Present	kâmbe/kândeme	kândi	kânde	kâmbi/kândemi	kândeni	kândene
Present progressive	dar(eme)-kâmbe	dar(i)-kândi	dar(e)-kânde	dar(emi)-kâmbi	dar(eni)-kândeni	dar(ene)-kândene
Subjunctive	hâkânem	hâkâni	hâkâne	hâkânim	hâkânin	hâkânen
Future	xâmbe hâkânem	xâni hâkâni	xâne hâkâne	xâmbi hâkânim	xânni hâkânin	xânne hâkânen

== Usage ==
=== Function cases ===
Case	Position	Meaning
Sere -(a/o/e)	Nominative	The Home
Sere re	Accusative	(Action) the Home
Sere -(o/e)	Vocative	Home!
Sere şe	Genitive	Home's
Sere re	Dative	To the Home
Sere ye jä	Ablative/Instrumental	By the Home

=== Adjectives ===
Adjective	Position	Meaning
And-e Sere	Applicative	
Gat-e Sere	Comparative	Great Home
Untä Sere	Determinative	That Home

=== Notable postpositions ===
Adpositions in Mazanderani are after words, while most of other languages including English and Persian have preposition systems in general. The only common postpositions that sometimes become preposition are Še and tā. Frequently used postpositions are:

postposition	meaning
dəle	in
re	of / to
je	from / by
vəse	for
tā	to
həmrā / jā	with
səri	on / above
bəne	under / below
pəli	near / about
vāri/ tarā	like
derū	among / inside

=== Suffixes ===
The list below is a sample list obtained from the Online Mazanderani-Persian dictionary.

==== Locatives ====
Suffix	Example	Meaning
-kash	Kharkash	Good place
-kel	Tutkel	Mulberry limit
-ij	Yoshij	Yoshian
-bon	Chenarbon	At the plantain
-ja	Səreja	Relating to home
-sar	Bənesar	Underneath

==== Subjectives ====
Suffix	Example	Meaning
-chaf	Auchhaf	Water-sucker
-rush	Halikrush	Berry-seller
-su	Vərgsu	Wolf-hunter
-kaf	Ukaf	One who performs actions in water
-vej	Galvej	Mouse-finder
-yel	Vəngyel	Bandmaster

== Phonology ==
=== Vowels ===
	Front	Central	Back
Close	i		u
Mid	e	ə	o
Open	a		ɑ

/a/ may also range to near-open [æ] or a more back [ʌ]. Allophones of /e, u, o, ɑ/ are heard as [ɪ, ʊ, ɒ]. /ə/ can also be heard as [ɛ] or [ɐ].

=== Consonants ===
		Labial	Dental/ Alveolar	(Palato-) alveolar	Velar	Uvular	Glottal
Nasal		m	n				
Stop/ Affricate	voiceless	p	t	t͡ʃ	k	q	(ʔ)
Stop/ Affricate	voiced	b	d	d͡ʒ	ɡ	(ɢ)	
Fricative	voiceless	f	s	ʃ	x		h
Fricative	voiced	v~(w)	z	ʒ		ʁ	
Approximant		v~(w)	l	j			
Tap/Flap			ɾ				

/w/ appears as an allophone of /v/ in word-final position. /ɾ/ may appear as a voiceless trill in word-final position [r̥]. An occasional glottal stop /ʔ/ or voiceless uvular fricative /ʁ/ or voiced plosive /ɢ/ may also be heard, depending on the dialect.

== Orthography ==
Mazanderani is commonly written in the Perso-Arabic script. However, some use the Roman alphabet, for example in SMS messages.

== Vocabulary ==
Spoken in a territory sheltered by the high Alborz mountains, Mazanderani preserves many ancient Indo-European words no longer in common use in modern Iranian languages such as Persian. Listed below are a few common Mazanderani words of archaic, Indo-European provenance with Vedic cognates.

English	Mazanderani	Persian	Vedic	Proto-Indo-European	Example of
new	neo	no / now	návas	*néwos	adjective
great	gat	bozorg, gozorg, gonde, got			adjective
better	better	behtar			adverb
been	bine	budeh			auxiliary verb
being	bien	budan	bhū-	*bʰuH-	infinitive of verb
father	piar	pedar			noun
mother	mâr	mâdar			noun
brother	berar	barâdar			noun
daughter	deter	dokhtar	dúhitā	*dʰugh₂tḗr	noun
grandpa	gatepa	pedar bozorg / pedar gozorg			noun
moon	moong / mong	mâh	mā́s	*mḗh₁n̥s	noun
cow	go / gu / guw	gâv	gáuṣ	*gʷṓws	noun
wolf	verg	gorg			noun
my	me / mi (before the noun)	am (after the noun), om	máma	*méne	verb
gab	gab	gap			verb
right	rast	râst			adjective
damage	damej	âsib			noun

Mazandarani is rich in synonyms, some such nouns also retaining the gender they possessed in Indo-European times: for instance the words miš, gal, gerz all have the meaning of mouse, although they are not all of the same gender. While many Indo-Iranian languages use a masculine noun taking such related forms as muš or muska or mušk, in Mazandarani the most commonly used name for the mouse is the feminine noun gal.

Another example relates to the cow, the most important animal in the symbolism of Indo-European culture: in Mazanderani there are more than 1000 recognized words used for different types of cow. The table below lists some specimens of this rich vocabulary. In Mazandaran there are even contests held to determine those with the greatest knowledge of this bovine nomenclature.

Mazanderani name	Meaning	Mazanderani name	Meaning
ahl	Bull subdued	nū dūş	Young plough bull used for the first time
āhy	Black-eyed cow	paei varzā	Single bull used for ploughing
alaşt	Miner's tool, ending in two wooden arcs	parū	Cattle for ploughing
baKhte bāri	Bullock and traces	raji	A cow that is ready to mate
bāreng	Reddish-brown cow	raş go	Crimson cow with black spots
batkoniye	Castrated male bovine cattle to eliminate it from washing down	raş jūnkā	Young bull with red and black streaks
būr gele	Yellow / red cow	raş kamer	Brown-and-white cow
būr şāx	Sharp, red points of a cow's horns	sārū	Bull with a white forehead
būrek	Light yellow bull	sārū	Bull with a white forehead
būreng	Blonde cow	şelāb beze gozūr	The new wide calf rain caused a sharp volley crumbled
būrmango	Fawn cow	selnāz	Cow streaked with white from nose to tail
das kare	Place where bull fights held	sembe band	Ox bearing a wooden yoke
de jet	Rust-coloured cow killed by two bulls	serxe sel	Red cow with a white stripe from neck to tail
demes mār	Cow with a two-year-old calf	setāre	Black-and-white-spotted cow
demis mār	Two-year-old bull calf	seyā bare	Black cow with a white forehead.
dūşt hākerden	Provoke a bull to attack	seyā kachal	Black cow with black spots on the tail end of the frontal
elā elā şāğ	Cow with horns growing in opposite directions	seyā sel	Black cow with a white line running along its spine to its tail
elā kal	Cow with large open horns	seyel	White-bellied cow
elā şiro	Cow with spreading horns	şir vej	Gelded calf or bull
elāşāx	A bull that has large open horns	şirū	A cow with a white head and tail
emūj	Ox that once trained for ploughing	şūkā	Pale yellow cow
eşte	Pair of cows for work	tā şū	Miner's cow, only to be closed
ezāli	Cow that is bred to plough	tağr in	Pair of four-year-old cows inseminated naturally
fal	Cow ready for mating	tal go	A cow that is ready for ploughing
fares	Ox that has not been taught to portage	tāle mār	Cow with bells hung around his neck
ğalfer	Bovine of a yellowish colour	tarise	Cow whose first calf is female and has reached two years of age
jandek	Bull bison that used for mating	tersekā	Two-and-a-half-year-old cow that is ready to mate
jānekā	Strong, young bull left ungelded for the purposes of breeding or combat	teş kūle	A young bull
jinekā	Young bull	teşk	Young bull that is not yet ready for ploughing
jonde kā sare	Place where young bulls and breeding cattle are raised	teşkel	Small bull
jone kā kole	Bullock less than two years old that has done no work	titāppeli mango	Black and white cow
jūndekā	Bullock more than two years old that has done no work	tolom	Young cow – heifer
jūnekkā	Young bulls	tūz kel	bull
jūnekkā jang	Quarrel between young bulls	varzā	Bullock
Khāmod	Ox plough	xāl dār	Bovine with bicoloured coat
lāch kal	Cow with open horns	xes xesi go	A cow that lies down on the ground while working
lachchi	Open cow horns that grow in opposite directions	xetūr	Alarmed cow
lase sar gū	Cow that goes to everyone	xik chaf	A cow that refuses to give milk to calves or its owner
lūş beni	Bridegroom's gift cow	zām borde	Cow missed after giving birth
māgū	A cow	zanā gū	Cow fighting with its horns
mango	Relating to lactating cows	zar xāl	Black cow with yellow spots
mārşan	Young cow	zargele	Yellow cow
mārū	Cow with a white forehead	zemessūni kar	Cow that leans due to food shortages in the winter
merem	Lovely young cow	zingāl	Black cow with white legs

== Influences exerted by Mazanderani ==
=== Modern-day of Iran ===
In Iran, there are some popular companies and products, such as Rika (boy) or Kija (girl), which take their name from Mazanderani words.

=== In non-Iranian languages ===
There are some Mazanderani loanwords in the Turkmen language.

== Examples ==
The following verses are in an eastern Mazandarani dialect spoken in the Caspian littoral in northern Iran. They were transcribed and translated by Maryam Borjian and Habib Borjian.

bεlεndi níš^{tε}mε vεlεnd-e nεfār-ε
bεlbεl xavεr biārdε nо̄bεhār ε
dār-e čel-ču-rε bā^{u}r ánde nέnāle
batεrkessέ dεl dā́rmo qam-e yār-ε

Translation:

I was sitting [on] the heights, on the lofty nefār;
The nightingale brought the news that it is early spring.
Tell the tree branches not to lament so much,
I have a blasted heart for the care of the beloved.

bεlεnd-e bālxεnε, bεlεnd-e lamε
vέne sar ništ bío Āl-e Mohammεd
har ki mεn o tέrε bázunε tomεt
vεšúnnε bákuše Darviš Mohammεd

Translation:

The lofty balcony, the long mat;
On its top had sat the Dynasty of Muhammad.
Whoever lay the blame on you and me,
May Dervish Muhammad kill him (lit. 'them')!
