= Gilaki language =

Iranian language spoken in Gilan Province, Iran

Gilaki
- گیلٚکی زٚوان (Gilaki Zavan)
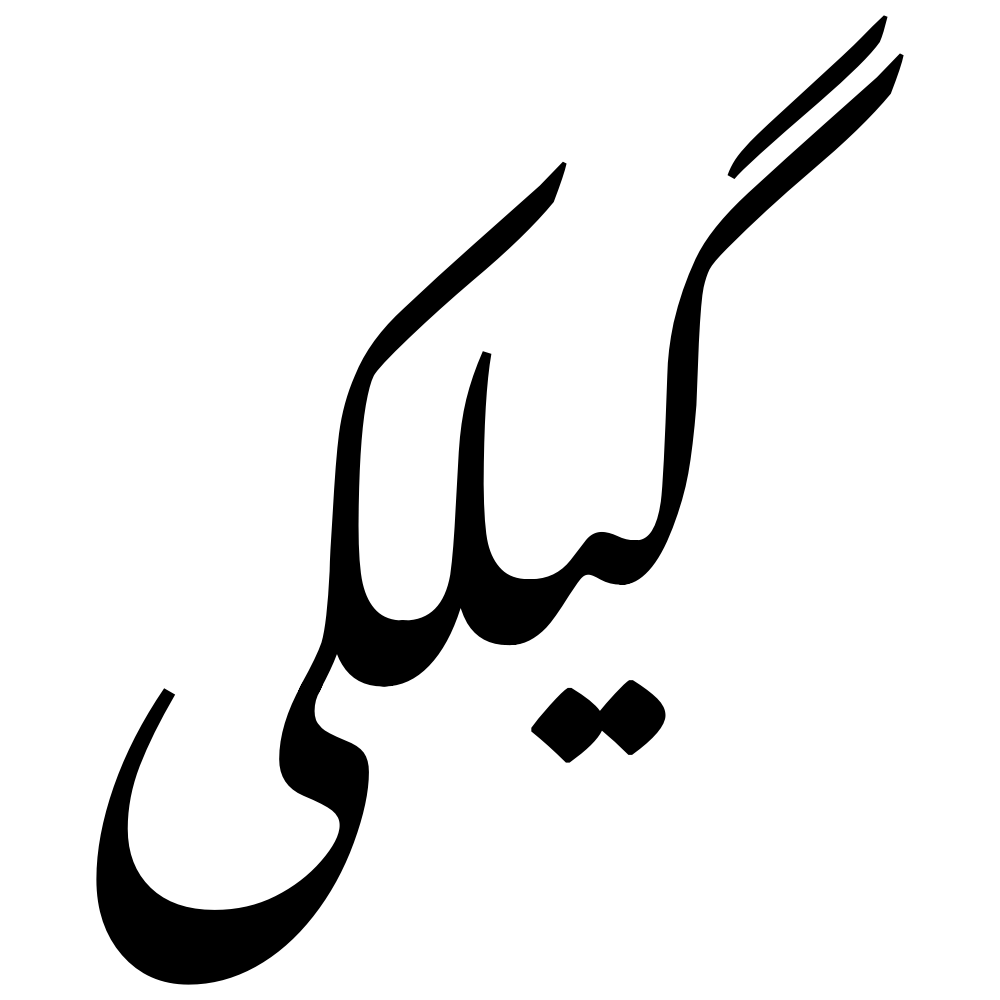
- Native to: Iran, province of Gilan and parts of the province of Mazandaran and Qazvin also Alborz
- Region: Southwest coast of the Caspian Sea
- Ethnicity: Gilaks
- Native speakers: 1.6 million (2023)
- Language family: Indo-European: Indo-Iranian; Iranian; Western; Northwestern; Caspian; Gilaki–Rudbari; Gilaki
- Dialects: Western Gilaki; Eastern Gilaki; Galeshi Gilaki

Language codes
- ISO 639-3: glk
- Glottolog: gila1242
- Linguasphere: 58-AAC-eb
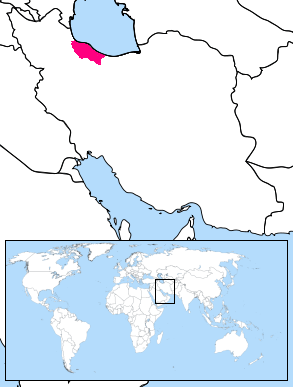
- Areas where Gilaki is spoken as the mother tongue

Gilaki (گیلٚکی زٚوان romanized: Gilaki Zavan) is an Iranian language belonging to the Caspian group of the North-western branch, spoken in south & West of the Caspian Sea by Gilak people. Gilaki is closely related to Mazandarani. The two languages of Gilaki and Mazandarani have similar vocabularies. The Gilaki and Mazandarani languages (but not other Iranian languages) share certain typological features with Caucasian languages (specifically Kartvelian languages), reflecting the history, ethnic identity, and close relatedness to the Caucasus region and Caucasian peoples of the Gilak people and Mazandarani people.

== Classification ==
Glottolog classifies Gilaki and its dialects within the Caspian subgroup of Iranian languages, along with Mazanderani and Gorgani. In addition to other Caspian dialects, Gilaki exhibits significant linguistic affinities with Zaza, a minority language spoken in Turkey.

== Dialects ==
The language is divided into three dialects: Western Gilaki, Eastern Gilaki and Deylami. The western and eastern dialects are separated by the Sefid River, while Daylami is spoken in the mountains of eastern & western & southern Gilan and western Mazandaran and more. There are three main dialects but larger cities in Gilan have slight variations to the way they speak. These "sub-dialects" are Rashti, Rudbari, Some’e Sarai, Lahijani, Langerudi, Rudesari, Bandar Anzali, Fumani, Alamouti and Taleghani. Progressing to the east, Gilaki gradually blends into Mazandarani. The intermediate dialects of the area between Tonokābon and Kalārdašt serve as a transition between Gilaki and Mazandarani. The differences in forms and vocabulary lead to a low mutual intelligibility with either Gilaki or Mazandarani, and so these dialects should probably be considered a third separate language group of the Caspian area. In Mazandaran, Gilaki is spoken in the city of Ramsar and Tonekabon. Although the dialect is influenced by Mazandarani, it is still considered a Gilaki dialect. Furthermore, the eastern Gilaki dialect is spoken throughout the valley of the Chalus river. In Qazvin province, Gilaki is spoken in northern parts of the province, in Alamut.

== Grammar ==
Gilaki, is an inflected and genderless language. It is considered SVO, although in sentences employing certain tenses the order may be SOV.

== Dispersion ==
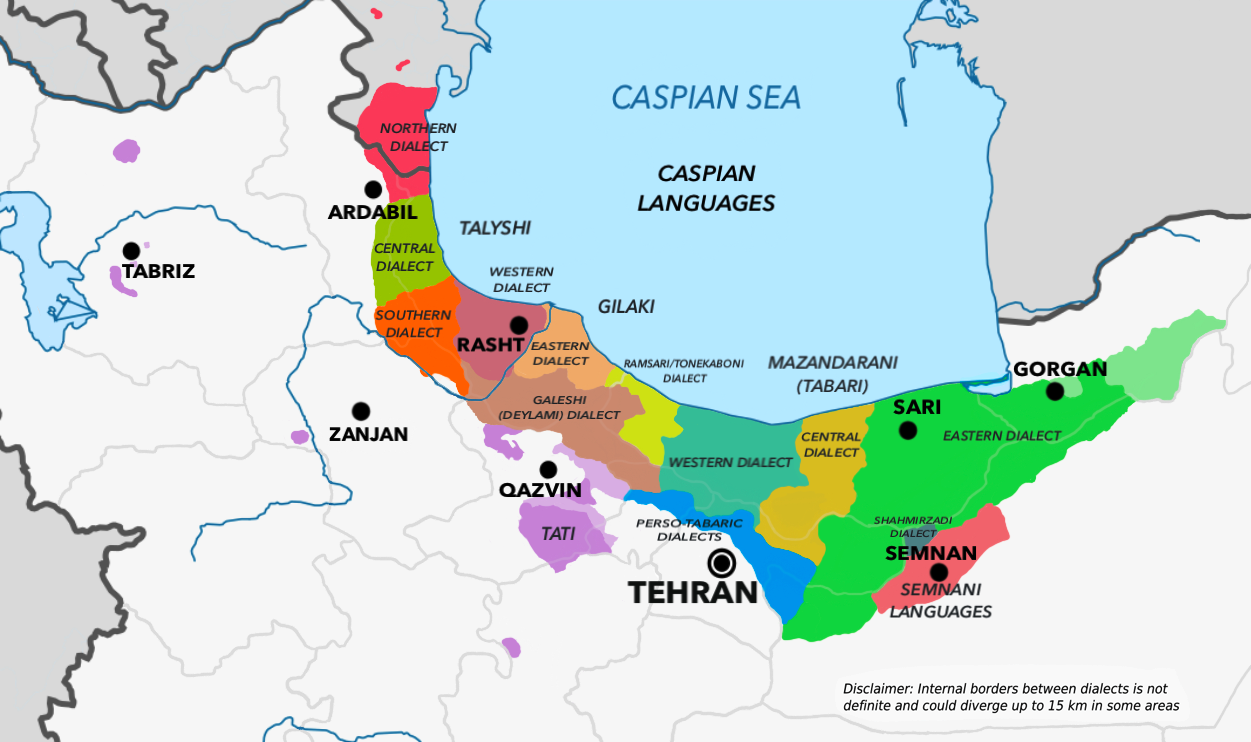
Map depicting areas where the various dialects of Gilaki are spoken

Gilaki is the language of the majority of people in Gilan province and also a native and well-known language in Mazandaran, Qazvin and Alborz provinces. Gilaki is spoken in different regions with different dialects and accents. The number of Gilaki speakers is estimated at 1.6 million.

== Phonology ==
Gilaki has the same consonants as Persian, but different vowels. Here is a table of correspondences for the Western Gilaki of Rasht, which will be the variety used in the remainder of the article:

| Gilaki | Persian | Example (Gilaki) |
|---|---|---|
| i | e | ki.tab |
| e(ː) | iː, eː/ei | seb |
| ɛ(œ) | e | iɛrɛ |
| ə | æ, e | mən |
| a | aː | lag |
| ä | æ | zäy |
| ɒ (perhaps allophonic) | aː | lɒ.nə |
| o | uː, oː/ɔ | d͡ʒoɾ |
| u | o/uː | ɡul |
| ü | u | tüm |

There are nine vowel phonemes in the Gilaki language:

| | Front | Central | Back |
|---|---|---|---|
| Close | i iː | | u uː |
| Mid | e | ə | o |
| Open | a | | ɒ |

The consonants are:

Gilaki Consonants
| | | Labial | Alveolar | Post-alveolar | Velar | Uvular | Glottal |
|---|---|---|---|---|---|---|---|
| Stop | voiceless | p | t | t͡ʃ | k | | ʔ |
| Stop | voiced | b | d | d͡ʒ | ɡ | | |
| Fricative | voiceless | f | s | ʃ | x ~ χ | | h |
| Fricative | voiced | v | z | ʒ | ɣ ~ ʁ | | |
| Nasal | | m | n | | ŋ | | |
| Liquid | | | l, ɾ ~ r | | | | |
| Glide | | | | j | | | |

== Verb system ==
The verb system of Gilaki is very similar to that of Persian. All infinitives end in -tən/-dən, or in -V:n, where V: is a long vowel (from contraction of an original *-Vdən). The present stem is usually related to the infinitive, and the past stem is just the infinitive without -ən or -n (in the case of vowel stems).

=== Present tenses ===
From the infinitive dín, "to see", we get present stem din-.

==== Present indicative ====
Gilaki, Zaza, Mazandarani and other Caspian languages derive their present stems from the same old Iranian present participle /*-ant/ in contrast to the Perside modal prefixes added to the present stem of the verb, e.g. -mi in Persian and -di in Kurdish:

| | Gilaki | Zaza | Mazanderani | Persian | Kurdish |
|---|---|---|---|---|---|
| 3S "to do" | ku-n-e | ke-n-o | kar-n-e | mi-kon-ad | di-k-e |
| 3S "to eat" | xo-n-e | we-n-o | xar-n-e | mi-xor-ad | di-xw-e- |
| 3S "to go" | šu-n-e | šo-n-o | šo-n-e | mi-rav-ad | di-ç-e |

The present indicative is formed by adding the personal endings to this stem.

| Singular | Plural |
|---|---|
| dinəm | diním(i) |
| diní | diníd(i) |
| diné | diníd(i) |

==== Present subjunctive ====
The present subjunctive is formed with the prefix bí-, bú-, or bə- (depending on the vowel in the stem) added to the indicative forms. Final /e/ neutralizes to /ə/ in the 3rd singular and the plural invariably lacks final /i/.

| Singular | Plural |
|---|---|
| bídinəm | bídinim |
| bídini | bídinid |
| bídinə | bídinid |

The negative of both the indicative and the subjunctive is formed in the same way, with n- instead of the b- of the subjunctive.

=== Past tenses ===
==== Preterite ====
From xurdən, "to eat", we get the perfect stem xurd. To this are added unaccented personal endings and the unaccented b- prefix (or accented n- for the negative):

| Singular | Plural |
|---|---|
| buxúrdəm | buxúrdim(i) |
| buxúrdi | buxúrdid(i) |
| buxúrdə | buxúrdid(i) |

==== Imperfect ====
The imperfect is formed with what was originally a suffix -i:

| xúrdim | xúrdim(i) |
| xúrdi | xúrdid(i) |
| xúrdi | xúrdid(i) |

==== Pluperfect ====
The pluperfect is paraphrastically formed with the verb bon, "to be", and the past participle, which is in turn formed with the perfect stem+ə (which can assimilate to become i or u). The accent can fall on the last syllable of the participle or on the stem itself:

| Singular | Plural |
|---|---|
| buxurdə bum | buxurdə bim |
| buxurdə bi | buxurdə bid |
| buxurdə bu | buxurdə bid |

==== Past subjunctive ====
A curious innovation of Western Gilaki is the past subjunctive, which is formed with the (artificial) imperfect of bon+past participle:

| Singular | Plural |
|---|---|
| bidé bim | bidé bim |
| bidé bi | bidé bid |
| bidé be/bi | bidé bid |

This form is often found in the protasis and apodosis of unreal conditions, e.g., mən agə Əkbəra bidé bim, xušhal bubosti bim, "If I were to see/saw/had seen Akbar, I would be happy".

=== Progressive ===
There are two very common paraphrastic constructions for the present and past progressives. From the infinitive šon, "to go", we get:

==== Present progressive ====
| Singular | Plural |
|---|---|
| šón darəm | šón darim |
| šón dari | šón darid |
| šón darə | šón darid |

==== Past progressive ====
| Singular | Plural |
|---|---|
| šón də/du bum | šón də/di bim |
| šón də/di bi | šón də/di bid |
| šón də/du bu | šón də/di bid |

=== Compound verbs ===
There are many compound verbs in Gilaki, whose forms differ slightly from simple verbs. Most notably, bV- is never prefixed onto the stem, and the negative prefix nV- can act like an infix -n-, coming between the prefix and the stem. So from fagiftən, "to get", we get present indicative fagirəm, but present subjunctive fágirəm, and the negative of both, faángirəm or fanígirəm. The same applies to the negative of the past tenses: fángiftəm or fanígiftəm.

== Nouns, cases and postpositions ==
Gilaki employs a combination of quasi-case endings and postpositions to do the work of many particles and prepositions in English and Persian.

=== Cases ===
There are essentially three "cases" in Gilaki, the nominative (or, better, unmarked, as it can serve other grammatical functions), the genitive, and the (definite) accusative. The accusative form is often used to express the simple indirect object in addition to the direct object. A noun in the genitive comes before the word it modifies. These "cases" are in origin actually just particles, similar to Persian ra.

==== Nouns ====
For the word "per", father, we have:

| | Singular | Plural |
|---|---|---|
| Nom | per | perán |
| Acc | pera | perána |
| Gen | perə | peránə |

The genitive can change to -i, especially before some postpositions.

==== Pronouns ====
The 1st and 2nd person pronouns have special forms:

| | Singular | Plural |
|---|---|---|
| Nom | mən | amán |
| Acc | məra | amána |
| Gen | mi | amí |

| | Singular | Plural |
|---|---|---|
| Nom | tu | šumán |
| Acc | təra | šumána |
| Gen | ti | šimí |

The 3rd person (demonstrative) pronouns are regular: /un/, /u.ˈʃan/, /i.ˈʃan/

=== Postpositions ===
With the genitive can be combined many postpositions. Examples:

| Gilaki | English |
|---|---|
| re | for |
| həmra/əmra | with |
| ĵa | from, than (in comparisons) |
| mian | in |
| ĵor | above |
| ĵir | under |
| ru | on top of |

The personal pronouns have special forms with "-re": mere, tere, etc.

== Adjectives ==
Gilaki adjectives come before the noun they modify, and may have the genitive "case ending" -ə/-i. They do not agree with the nouns they modify.

- Example for adjectival modification: Western Gilaki: pilla-yi zakan ("big children"), Surx gul ("red flower"). Eastern Gilaki: Sərd ow ("cold water", ɑb-e særd in Persian), kul čaqu ("dull knife", čaqu-ye kond in Persian).

=== Possessive constructions ===
- Examples for possessive constructions of nouns in Western Gilaki: Məhine zakan ("Mæhin's children", Bæčeha-ye Mæhin in Persian), Baγi gulan ("garden flowers", Golha-ye baγ in Persian). In Eastern Gilaki: Xirsi kuti ("bear cub", Bæč-e xers in Persian).
