= Gilaks =

Iranian ethnic group

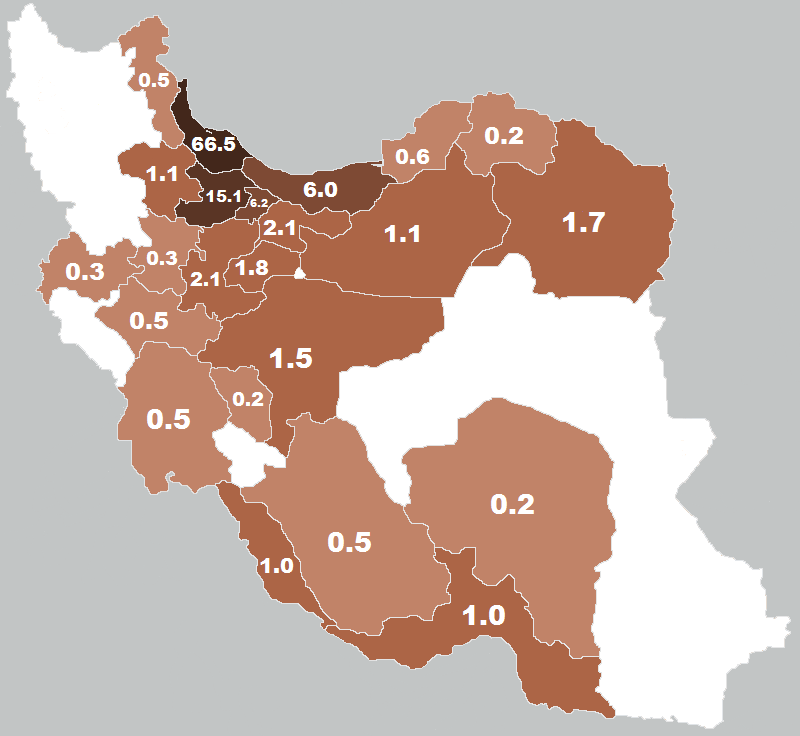

Total population
- 3–4 million

Regions with significant populations
- Gilan and parts of the provinces of Mazandaran, Qazvin, Tehran and Alborz

Languages
- Gilaki

Religion
- Twelver Shia Islam, Zoroastrian

Related ethnic groups
- Other Iranian peoples, especially Mazanderani people, Talysh people, Kurds, Zaza people, and Tat people

The Gilaks (Gilaki: گيلٚکاٚٓن, romanized: Giləkān) are an Iranian people native to south of the Caspian Sea. They form one of the main ethnic groups residing in the northern parts of Iran. Gilak people, along with the closely related Mazandarani people, comprise part of the Caspian people, who inhabit the southern and southwestern coastal regions of the Caspian Sea.

They all speak the Gilaki language as their first language, an Iranian language that is closely related to Mazandarani.

== History ==
The mountainous regions of northern Iran on the southwest coast of the Caspian Sea, now comprising the southeastern half of Gilan Province, was also referred to as Daylam. The inhabitants of the region were called the Daylamites.

Gilan was the place of origin of the Ziyarid dynasty and Buyid dynasty in the mid-10th century.

The rule of the Daylamites were put to an end by the Turkish invasions of the 10th and 11th centuries CE, which saw the rise of Ghaznavid and Seljuk dynasties. From the 11th century CE to the rise of Safavids, Gilan was ruled by local rulers who paid tribute to the dominant power south of the Alborz range but ruled independently, such as the Eshaqvand Dynasty and the Ispahbads of Gilan.

Scholars suggest a link between the Gilaks and the Zazas. Zaza calls themselves Dimlī or Dīmla, derived from the word Daylam. Dimli is the name of the Zaza language.

== Culture ==
=== Economy ===
Gilaki people live alongside the Alborz mountains and in the surrounding plains. Consequentially, those living along the northern side of the Alborz mountains tend to raise livestock, while those living in the plains farm. Gilaks play an important role in the provincial and national economy, supplying a large portion of the region's agricultural staples, such as rice, grains, tobacco, and tea. Other major industries include fishing and caviar exports, and the production of silk. In addition to agricultural activities, Gilaks also control other principal sectors of commerce of the province of Gilan such as tourism, and share administrative and government positions with civil servants from other regions of Iran.

=== People ===
The population of Gilaks is estimated to be between 3 and 4 million in 2006.

They mainly live along the southwest coasts of the Caspian Sea and are one of the main ethnic groups that reside in the northern parts of Iran. The Gilaks are closely related to the neighboring Mazandarani, and other groups of Caucasus descent, such as Georgians, Armenians, and Azerbaijanis.

=== Distribution ===
Gilaks make up approximately 70% of the population in Gilan province.

Gilaki, which has two main dialect types, eastern and western, with the Safidrūd River as the general border, is a member of the Caspian subgroup. There are many subdialects of Gilaki, and, progressing to the east, it gradually blends into Mazandarani. The intermediate dialects of the area between Tonokābon and Kalārdašt serve as a transition between Gilaki and Mazandarani. The differences in forms and vocabulary lead to a low mutual intelligibility with either Gilaki or Mazandarani, and so these dialects should probably be considered a third separate language group of the Caspian area.

In Mazandaran, the Gilaks reside in the city of Ramsar and Tonekabon. There, though their dialects are influenced by Mazandarani, they are still considered dialects of the Gilaki language. Furthermore, the eastern Gīlakī dialect is spoken in the entire valley of the Čālūs river.

In Qazvin province, the Gilaks reside in the northern parts of the province, in Alamut.

Apart from four Turkish-speaking villages higher up, the inhabitants of Alamut speak Gilaki and those of Rudbar Tati.

=== Language ===
The Gilaki language is a member of the Northwestern branch of the Iranian languages. It is the main language spoken amongst the Gilak people, although various regional and local dialects of the Gilaki language are common. Gilak people are fluent in both the Gilaki language and standard Persian. Persian is the official language of education in Iran, and since teachers are discouraged from using regional dialects and accents in class, the Gilaki language is taught to children at home.

The Gilaki and Mazandarani languages (but not other Iranian languages) share certain typological features with Caucasian languages. However, with the growth of education and press, the differentiation between Gilaki language and other Iranian languages is likely to disappear. Gilaki is closely related to Mazandarani and the two languages have similar vocabularies. These two languages retain more than Persian does of the noun declension system that was characteristic of older Iranian languages.

=== Genetics ===
The Gilaks and their closely related Mazandarani occupy the South Caspian region of Iran and speak languages belonging to the North-Western branch of Iranian languages. It has been suggested that their ancestors came from the Caucasus region, perhaps displacing an earlier group in the South Caspian. Linguistic evidence supports this scenario, in that the Gilaki and Mazandarani languages (but not other Iranian languages) share certain typological features with Caucasian languages. There have been patterns analyzed of mtDNA and Y chromosome variation in the Gilaki and Mazandarani.

Based on mtDNA HV1 sequences, the Gilaks and Mazandarani most closely resemble their geographic and linguistic neighbors, namely other Iranian groups. However, their Y chromosome types most closely resemble those found in groups from the South Caucasus. A scenario that explains these differences is a south Caucasian origin for the ancestors of the Gilaki and Mazandarani, followed by introgression of women (but not men) from local Iranian groups, possibly because of patrilocality. Given that both mtDNA and language are maternally transmitted, the incorporation of local Iranian women would have resulted in the concomitant replacement of the ancestral Caucasian language and mtDNA types of the Gilaki and Mazandarani with their current Iranian language and mtDNA types. Concomitant replacement of language and mtDNA may be a more general phenomenon than previously recognized.

The Mazandarani and Gilaki groups fall inside a major cluster consisting of populations from the Caucasus and West Asia and are particularly close to the South Caucasus groups—Georgians, Armenians, and Azerbaijanis. Iranians from Tehran and Isfahan are situated more distantly from these groups.

=== Haplogroups ===
The Gilaks display a high frequency of Y-DNA haplogroups R1b, J2a, and G2a3b.

== Assimilated groups into the Gilak people ==
During the Safavid, Afsharid, and Qajar eras, Gilan was settled by large numbers of Georgians, Circassians, Armenians and by other peoples of the Caucasus, whose descendants still live across Gilan.

== See also ==
- Caspian people
- Gilan Province
- Iranian peoples
- Mazandarani people
- Northwestern Iran
- Peoples of the Caucasus
- Persian dance
