= Caspian languages =

Iranian language branch

Caspian
- Geographic distribution: South coast of the Caspian Sea
- Linguistic classification: Indo-European: Indo-Iranian; Iranian; Western Iranian; Northwestern Iranian; Caspian
- Subdivisions: Gilaki; Mazandarani; Gorgani †; Taleshi

Language codes
- Glottolog: casp1236
- The Caspian languages

The Caspian languages are a key branch of North-Western Iranian languages spoken in Iran and parts of the Azerbaijan Republic, south and west of the Caspian Sea. They are also unique in sharing some typological features with the Kartvelian languages. Although spoken on the southern and western Caspian coasts, the Caspian languages and dialects share significant linguistic similarities with the Zaza language, spoken in Anatolia.

== Classification ==
Glottolog lists the Caspian languages as Gilaki-Rudbari, Mazanderani-Shahmirzadi and Gorgani. Similarly, according to Ethnologue, the Caspian languages consist of Gilaki, Mazanderani and Shahmirzadi.

== Related languages ==
Languages such as Zaza, Talysh, Tati, Gorani and Balochi are closely related to the Caspian languages. Although not spoken in the Caspian region today, according to the long-standing theories the Zaza, Balochi, and Gurani languages originated in the Caspian region and Zazas, Balochis and Gurans migrated from the Caspian region to their present-day settlements.

== Languages ==
The Caspian subgroup includes the languages listed below:

- Northwestern Iranian
  - Caspian
    - Gilaki-Rudbari
      - Gilaki
        - Western Gilaki
        - Eastern Gilaki
      - Rudbari
    - Gorgani
    - Mazanderani-Shahmirzadi
      - Mazanderani
        - Central Caspian
        - Nuclear Mazanderani
      - Shahmirzadi
