= Sayyid Fakhr al-Din =

Ruler of Rustamdar
- Reign: 1381–1390
- Predecessor: Adud al-Dawla Qubad (Baduspanids)
- Successor: Sa'd al-Dawla Tus (Baduspanids)
- Died: 1400s Kashghar
- Dynasty: Mar'ashis
- Father: Mir-i Buzurg
- Religion: Twelver Shia Islam

Sayyid Fakhr al-Din (Persian: سید فخرالدین) was a Mar'ashi prince, who ruled the region of Rustamdar from 1381 to 1390. He shared power with his three other brothers; Kamal al-Din I in Sari; Rida al-Din in Amul; and Sharaf al-Din in Karatughan. Together, they ruled a realm encompassing all of Mazandaran, reaching as far west to the city of Qazvin. They had inherited this realm from their father Mir-i Buzurg (r. 1359–1362), the founder of the Mar'ashis.

Rustamdar had originally been part of the Baduspanids, however, shortly after the accession of the Baduspanid ruler Adud al-Dawla Qubad (r. 1379–1381), the Mar'ashis accused him of being uncooperative and mistreating the dervishes of their order. Intenting to incorporate Rustamdar into their domains, Fakhr al-Din defeated Qubad and seized the coastal parts of Rustamdar in 1380.

A year later (1381), a Mar'ashi force defeated and killed Qubad at a battle at Laktor. The fortress of Kojur was conquered and made the permanent residence of Fakhr al-Din; the Mar'ashis were now the masters of all of Mazandaran. The Baduspanids were temporarily ousted from power, until almost a decade later in 1390, when Kamal al-Din I installed Sa'd al-Dawla Tus on the Baduspanid throne in Rustamdar to challenge the Afrasiyabid prince Iskandar-i Shaykhi who accompanied the Turco-Mongol ruler Timur (r. 1370–1405), who intended to conquer Mazandaran.

However, Tus secretly corresponded with Iskandar-i Shaykhi, and eventually joined the forces of Timur in 1392. The following year (1393), Timur dislodged the Mar'ashis and conquered Mazandaran. He split up their territories between rival families and Timurid governors. Tus managed to convince him to spare the Mar'ashi family; they were deported instead, while Iskandar-i Shaykhi was appointed governor of Mazandaran. By the time of Timur's death in 1405, Fakhr al-Din and Kamal al-Din had died in Kashghar.

== Sources ==
- Bosworth, C. E. (1984). "Āl-e Afrāsīāb". Encyclopædia Iranica, online edition, Vol. I, Fasc. 7. New York. pp. 742–743.
- Calmard, J (1991). "Marʿas̲h̲is". In Bosworth, C. E.; van Donzel, E. & Pellat, Ch. (eds.). The Encyclopaedia of Islam, Second Edition. Volume VI: Mahk–Mid. Leiden: E. J. Brill. ISBN 978-90-04-08112-3.
- Madelung, Wilferd (1988). "Baduspanids". Encyclopædia Iranica, online edition, Vol. III, Fasc. 4. New York. pp. 385–391.
- Manz, Beatrice Forbes (2007). Power, Politics and Religion in Timurid Iran. Cambridge University Press. ISBN 978-1-139-46284-6.

Preceded by Adud al-Dawla Qubad (Baduspanids)	Ruler of Rustamdar; 1381–1390	Succeeded by Sa'd al-Dawla Tus (Baduspanids)
