= Sa'd al-Dawla Tus =

Sa'd al-Dawla Tus (Persian: سعدالدوله توس) was the Baduspanid ruler (ustandar) of Rustamdar from 1390 to 1394. He was a son of ustandar Taj al-Dawla Ziyar (r. 1325–1333).

The Baduspanids had been temporarily removed from power after their ruler Adud al-Dawla Qubad (r. 1379–1381) was defeated and killed in 1381 by the Mar'ashis, who incorporated Rustamdar into their own domains, thus extending their sway over all of Mazandaran. Rulership over Rustamdar was assigned to the Mar'ashi prince Sayyid Fakhr al-Din.

In 1390, the Mar'ashis installed Tus on the Baduspanid throne to challenge the Afrasiyabid prince Iskandar-i Shaykhi who accompanied the Turco-Mongol ruler Timur (r. 1370–1405), who intended to conquer Mazandaran. However, Tus secretly corresponded with Iskandar-i Shaykhi, and eventually joined the forces of Timur in 1392. The following year (1393), Timur dislodged the Mar'ashis and conquered Mazandaran. He split up their territories between rival families and Timurid governors.

Tus managed to convince Timur to spare the Mar'ashi family; they were deported instead, while Iskandar-i Shaykhi was appointed governor of Mazandaran. In 1394, Tus was killed by his nephew Iskandar ibn Gustahm ibn Ziyar. It remains uncertain whether Iskandar succeeded him as ustandar or not. According to the 15th-century historian Zahir al-Din Mar'ashi, Kayumarth succeeded him, but the modern historian Wilferd Madelung doubts this, stating that Kayumarth "must have been too young at this time."

== Sources ==
- Bosworth, C. E. (1984). "Āl-e Afrāsīāb". Encyclopædia Iranica, online edition, Vol. I, Fasc. 7. New York. pp. 742–743.
- Calmard, J (1991). "Marʿas̲h̲is". In Bosworth, C. E.; van Donzel, E. & Pellat, Ch. (eds.). The Encyclopaedia of Islam, Second Edition. Volume VI: Mahk–Mid. Leiden: E. J. Brill. ISBN 978-90-04-08112-3.
- Madelung, Wilferd (1988). "Baduspanids". Encyclopædia Iranica, online edition, Vol. III, Fasc. 4. New York. pp. 385–391.
- Manz, Beatrice Forbes (2007). Power, Politics and Religion in Timurid Iran. Cambridge University Press. ISBN 978-1-139-46284-6.

Preceded by Sayyid Fakhr al-Din (Mar'ashis)	Ustandar of the Baduspanids; 1390–1394	Succeeded by Kayumarth I (?)
