= Awliya Allah Amuli =

Iranian historian

Awliya Allah Amuli was a 14th-century historian from Amul, who under the patronage of his Baduspanid suzerain Fakhr al-Dawla Shah-Ghazi (r. 1360–1379) wrote the Tarikh-i Ruyan. What little is known of his life is found in this work. At some point in his life, he made a pilgrimage to the Alid shrines in Iraq. Following the murder of the Bavandid ruler Hasan II (r. 1334–1349) and the collapse of his kingdom in 1349, Amuli left his native town for the Baduspanid-ruled Rustamdar, where he was allowed refuge by its ruler, Jalal al-Dawla Iskandar (r. 1333–1360).

== Sources ==
- Melville, Charles (2000). "The Caspian Provinces: A World Apart Three Local Histories of Mazandaran". Iranian Studies. 33 (1/2): 45–91. doi:10.1080/00210860008701976. JSTOR 4311334. S2CID 161557156. (registration required)
