= Iskandar-i Shaykhi =

Iskandar-i Shaykhi اسکندر شیخی
- Ispahbad

Ruler of Amul
- Reign: 1393–1403/4
- Predecessor: Rida al-Din (Mar'ashis)
- Successor: Sayyid Ali Sari (Mar'ashis)

Ruler of Firuzkuh
- Reign: 1393–1403/4
- Predecessor: Mar'ashi rule
- Successor: Kiya Husayn I
- Died: 1403/4; Shir-rud-duhazar or Firuzkuh
- Issue: Kiya Husayn I
- Dynasty: Afrasiyab dynasty
- Father: Kiya Afrasiyab
- Religion: Shia Islam

Iskandar-i Shaykhi (Persian: اسکندر شیخی), was an Iranian ispahbad from the Afrasiyab dynasty, who ruled Amul as a Timurid vassal from 1393 to 1403. He was the youngest son of Kiya Afrasiyab, who had initially established his rule in eastern Mazandaran from 1349 to 1359, but was defeated and killed by the local shaykh (religious scholar) Mir-i Buzurg, who established his own dynasty—the Mar'ashis—in the region. Together with some supporters and two nephews of his father, Iskandar initially took refuge in Larijan, but later left for Herat, where entered into the service of the Kartid ruler Ghiyath al-Din II (r. 1370–1389).

After Herat was captured by the Turco-Mongol ruler Timur (r. 1370–1405) in 1381, Iskandar joined the latter, whom he encouraged and accompanied in the conquest of Mazandaran in 1392–1393. After the Mar'ashis were dislodged, Timur assigned the governorship of Amul to Iskandar, but he soon staged a rebellion. Defeated, he was either killed by a Timurid army in 1403/4 at Shir-rud-duhazar, or committed suicide in the Alburz castle of Firuzkuh to avoid capture. One of his sons, Kiya Husayn I, was pardoned by Timur, who allowed him to retain control over Firuzkuh.

== Background ==
Map of northern Iran and its surroundings. The borders represent the traditional geographical boundaries of each region

Iskandar was the youngest son of Kiya Afrasiyab of the Afrasiyab dynasty, a family of ispahbads (local princes or military leaders) native to the city of Amul in eastern Mazandaran. They were also known as the Chalabis or Chalavis, after a district in Amul. Kiya Afrasiyab served as the general of his son-in-law, the Bavandid ispahbad Hasan II (r. 1334–1349), who ruled Amul and its surroundings. Late in his reign, Hasan II had his vizier Kiya Jalal ibn Ahmad Jal executed. This resulted in the alienation of his family—the powerful Kiya Jalili, which controlled Sari. This had many outraged, and made the Jalilids enter an alliance with the neighbouring Baduspanids of Rustamdar. Together, they attacked Amul, forcing Hasan II to surrender. The Baduspanid ruler (ustandar) Jalal al-Dawla Iskandar (r. 1333–1360), received Hasan II favorably, but the Chalabis distanced themselves from the latter.

Hasan II's wife (Kiya Afrasiyab's sister) accused him of seducing his stepdaughter and gained a fatwa from Amul which had him convicted. Two of Kiya Afrasiyab's sons, Ali Kiya and Muhammad Kiya, murdered Hasan II on 17 April 1349, thus marking the end of the ancient Bavandid line, which stretched back to the pre-Islamic era. While the sons of Hasan II fled to Jalal al-Dawla Iskandar, Kiya Afrasiyab established his authority in Amul, and also possibly Sari. His accession was met with outrage by many in eastern Mazandaran, which made him feign adherence to the influential shaykh (religious scholar) Mir-i Buzurg. This, however, soon backfired; the power of the shaykh increased, making Kiya Afrasiyab attempt to suppress it. Together with his three sons (Kiya Hasan, Kiya Ali, and Kiya Suhrab), he launched an attack on Mir-i Buzurg, but they were defeated and killed. Mir-i Buzurg subsequently took over eastern Mazandaran, establishing the Mar'ashi line.

== Biography ==
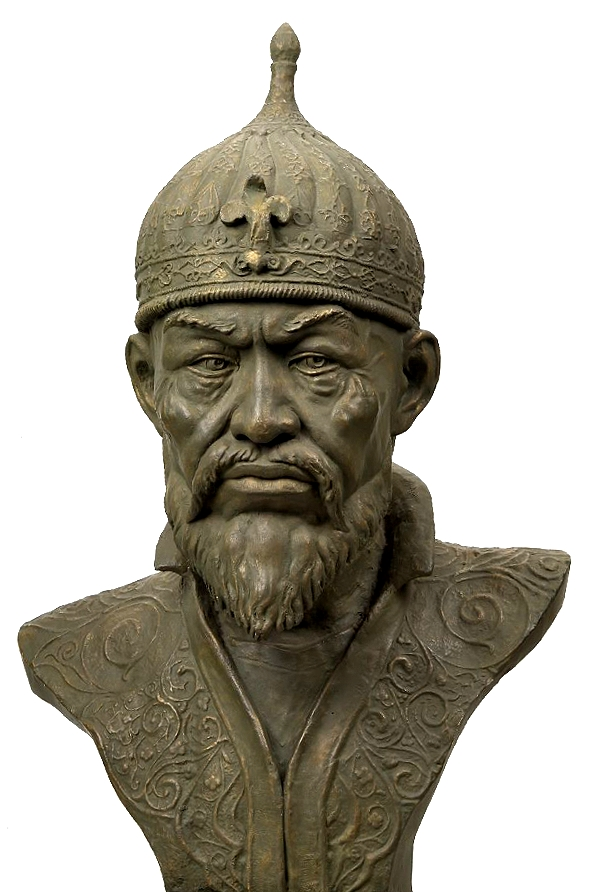
Facial reconstruction of the Turco-Mongol ruler Timur (r. 1370–1405), whom Iskandar-i Shaykhi encouraged and accompanied in the conquest of Mazandaran, being rewarded with the governorship of Amul in return

After Kiya Afrasiyab's death, some of his supporters returned to Amul and took with them two of his grandsons and Iskandar. Together, they first escaped to Larijan, where they hoped to be allowed refuge with their relative Kiya Hasan Kiya Damandar. At first, their request was declined, but Kiya Hasan later changed his mind, and granted them the districts of Ghazak and Sinak. Their stay was short-lived; the income from these districts proved insufficient, and thus one of Kiya Afrasiyab's men, Nur al-Din, took the young princes, together with some of their supporters, to the city of Shiraz in Fars and then to Sabziwar in Khorasan. There they pledged their service to the Sarbadarid ruler Ali ibn Mu'ayyad (r. 1362–1376, 1379–1386), who had rebelled against the Kartid ruler Ghiyath al-Din II (r. 1370–1389), who was based in Herat. Two different accounts are given about Iskandar during this event. According to the contemporary historian Zahir al-Din Mar'ashi (d. 1489), himself a member of the Mar'ashi family, he shifted his allegiance to Ghiyath al-Din II in 1374, because "treachery was in his nature."

After Ali ibn Mu'ayyad was defeated and killed, Iskandar settled in Herat. There he was present when the Turco-Mongol ruler Timur (r. 1370–1405) besieged it in 1381. He subsequently betrayed Ghiyath al-Din II and handed the city over to Timur. According to the account of the Persian historian Hafiz-i Abru (d. 1430), it was the Kartids, and not Sarbadarids that Iskandar first joined. He was successful in the Kartid efforts against Ali ibn Mu'ayyad, and was as a result rewarded with the governorship of the city of Nishapur. In 1375, Iskandar betrayed Ghiyath al-Din II by joining an anti-Kartid rebellion supported by local dervishes and the Muzaffarid ruler in Shiraz, Shah Shoja Mozaffari (r. 1358–1384). The rebellion failed, but Ghiyath al-Din II ultimately pardoned Iskandar, who remained in Herat until its capture by Timur.

Regardless, after the fall of Herat, Iskandar entered into the service of Timur. According to the Tarikh-i Tabaristan, he encouraged the latter to conquer Mazandaran by talking of its wealth and riches. While Iskandar had been away, the whole of Mazandaran had been conquered by the Mar'ashis, who now ruled a realm reaching as far west to the city of Qazvin. They had deposed the Baduspanid family in Rustamdar, but installed one of Jalal al-Dawla Iskandar's sons, Sa'd al-Dawla Tus on the throne to challenge Iskandar and Timur. However, Tus secretly corresponded with Iskandar, and eventually joined the forces of Timur in 1392. The following year (1393), Timur dislodged the Mar'ashis and conquered Mazandaran. He then entrusted Amul to Iskandar and Sari to Jamshid Qarin Ghuri. Tus managed to convince Timur to spare the Mar'ashi family, who were sent into exile in Transoxiana instead. Iskandar had the tomb of Mir-i Buzurg in Amul destroyed, which led to many people to move to Sari.

When Iskandar left his realm in 1399/1400 to join Timur's Azerbaijan expedition, the latter deprived the Baduspanids of most of their holdings by sending his troops to administer most of Rustamdar. The holdings of the new Baduspanid ruler Kayumarth I were now restricted to that of the castle of Nur. After his return to the Alburz castle of Firuzkuh in c. 1402, Iskandar staged a rebellion against Timur, who sent a force to subdue him. The commanders of the force requested the help of Kayumarth, due to his reputation as a rival of Iskandar. However, they had him deceived by capturing and sending him to Iskandar as a bargaining chip to convince him to cease his rebellion. However, Iskandar instantly had Kayumarth released, who left for the court of Timur's son at Shiraz.

Iskandar was either killed by a Timurid army in 1403/4 at Shir-rud-duhazar, or committed suicide in Firuzkuh to avoid capture. Timur appointed the Mar'ashi Sayyid Ali Sari as the governor of Amul, with his brother Ghiyath al-Din as his second-in-command. He pardoned Iskandar's two sons Kiya Ali and Kiya Husayn I, allowing the latter to retain control over Firuzkuh. After Timur's death in 1405, the Mar'ashis started to gradually assert their rule over their former territories.

== Sources ==
- Bosworth, C.E. (1978). "Ḳāwūs". In van Donzel, E.; Lewis, B.; Pellat, Ch. & Bosworth, C. E. (eds.). The Encyclopaedia of Islam, Second Edition. Volume IV: Iran–Kha. Leiden: E. J. Brill. OCLC 758278456.
- Bosworth, C. E. (1984). "Āl-e Afrāsīāb". In Yarshater, Ehsan (ed.). Encyclopædia Iranica. Vol. I/7: Ahriman–Alafrank. London and New York: Routledge & Kegan Paul. pp. 742–743. ISBN 978-0-71009-096-6.
- Madelung, Wilferd (1984). "Āl-e Bāvand". In Yarshater, Ehsan (ed.). Encyclopædia Iranica. Vol. I/7: Ahriman–Alafrank. London and New York: Routledge & Kegan Paul. pp. 747–753. ISBN 978-0-71009-096-6.
- Madelung, Wilferd (1988). "Baduspanids". In Yarshater, Ehsan (ed.). Encyclopædia Iranica. Vol. III/4: Bačča(-ye) Saqqā–Bahai Faith III. London and New York: Routledge & Kegan Paul. pp. 385–391. ISBN 978-0-71009-116-1.
- Calmard, J (1991). "Marʿas̲h̲is". In Bosworth, C. E.; van Donzel, E. & Pellat, Ch. (eds.). The Encyclopaedia of Islam, Second Edition. Volume VI: Mahk–Mid. Leiden: E. J. Brill. ISBN 978-90-04-08112-3.
- Manz, Beatrice Forbes (1999). The Rise and Rule of Tamerlane. Cambridge: Cambridge University Press. pp. 1–231. ISBN 9780521633840. "iskandar-i shaykhi."
- Manz, Beatrice Forbes (2007). Power, Politics and Religion in Timurid Iran. Cambridge University Press. ISBN 978-1-139-46284-6.
- Yavari, Neguin (2015). "Afrāsiyābids". In Fleet, Kate; Krämer, Gudrun; Matringe, Denis; Nawas, John; Rowson, Everett (eds.). Encyclopaedia of Islam (3rd ed.). Brill Online. ISSN 1873-9830.

Preceded by Rida al-Din (Marashis)	Afrasiyabid ruler 1393–1403	Succeeded by Kiya Husayn I
