= Vishtasp Jalali =

Vishtasp Jalali (Persian: ویشتاسب جلالی) was a local Iranian ruler of Sari during the struggle that ensured after the death of the Bavandid ruler Hasan II between the local rulers of Mazandaran. He was from the Jalali family, a family native to Mazandaran which ruled Sari as governors of the Bavandids.

== Biography ==
In 1349, Hasan II ordered the execution of one of his most powerful officials, Jalal ibn Ahmad Jal, who was from the Jalali family, and thus a relative of Vishtasp. The execution resulted in a revolt by the nobles of Mazandaran. Hasan then tried to get support from another Iranian family known as the Chulabids. However, the two sons of the Chulabid Kiya Afrasiyab, murdered Hasan while the latter was in a bath. Afrasiyab then gained control of the Bavandid territories, thus marking the end of the Bavand dynasty and the start of the Afrasiyab dynasty. He then made peace with the Jalali family, who had become the independent rulers of Sari. However, he was considered an usurper by his subjects, and was in 1359 overthrown by the Marashi Mir-i Buzurg.

Mir-i Buzurg then turned against Jalali family; a battle shortly ensured between Mir-i Buzurg and Vishtasp Jalali and another Jalali noble Fakhr al-Din Jalali, where Mir-i Buzurg was victorious. With the help of former loyalists of Kiya Afrasiyab, Vishtasp then killed a son of Mir-i Buzurg. During the same period, Fakhr al-Din Jalali and his four sons were shortly killed in a battle by Mir-i Buzurg, who shortly entered Sari. Vishtasp then fled from Sari and took refuge with his family in a fortress. However, Mir-i Buzurg shortly besieged the fortress, and managed to capture it. He then had Vishtasp and his seven sons executed. A son of Mir-i Buzurg, Kamal al-Din I, then married the daughter of Vishtasp.

== Sources ==
- Bosworth, C. E. (1984). "ĀL-E AFRĀSĪĀB". ĀL-E AFRĀSĪĀB (1) – Encyclopaedia Iranica. Encyclopaedia Iranica, Vol. I, Fasc. 7. London u.a.: Routledge & Kegan Paul. pp. 742–743. Archived from the original on 2014-02-20.
- Bosworth, C. E. (1989). "The Encyclopedia of Islam". The Encyclopaedia of Islam, Vol. 6, Fasc. 107-108. pp. 513–640. ISBN 9789004090828.
