= Adud al-Dawla Qubad =

Ruler of Rustamdar from 1379 to 1381

Adud al-Dawla Qubad was the Baduspanid ruler (ustandar) of Rustamdar from 1379 to 1381.

The son and successor of Fakhr al-Dawla Shah-Ghazi, Qubad was soon after his accession accused by the Mar'ashis of being uncooperative and mistreating the dervishes of their order. Intenting to incorporate Rustamdar into their domains, the Mar'ashi Sayyid Fakhr al-Din defeated Qubad and seized the coastal parts of Rustamdar in 1380.

A year later (1381), a Mar'ashi force defeated and killed Qubad at a battle at Laktor. The fortress of Kojur was conquered and made the permanent residence of Fakhr al-Din; the Mar'ashis were now the masters of all of Mazandaran. The Baduspanids were temporarily ousted from power, until almost a decade later in 1390, when the Mar'ashis installed Sa'd al-Dawla Tus on the Baduspanid throne in Rustamdar to challenge the Afrasiyabid prince Iskandar-i Shaykhi who accompanied the Turco-Mongol ruler Timur (r. 1370–1405), who intended to conquer Mazandaran.

== Sources ==
- Calmard, J (1991). "Marʿas̲h̲is". In Bosworth, C. E.; van Donzel, E. & Pellat, Ch. (eds.). The Encyclopaedia of Islam, Second Edition. Volume VI: Mahk–Mid. Leiden: E. J. Brill. ISBN 978-90-04-08112-3.
- Madelung, Wilferd (1988). "Baduspanids". Encyclopædia Iranica, online edition, Vol. III, Fasc. 4. New York. pp. 385–391.

Preceded by Fakhr al-Dawla Shah-Ghazi	Ustandar of the Baduspanids; 1379–1381	Succeeded by Sayyid Fakhr al-Din (Mar'ashis)
