= Mausoleum of Mir Bozorg =

Heritage site in Amol, Iran

Mausoleum of Mir Borozg
- مشهد میربزرگ
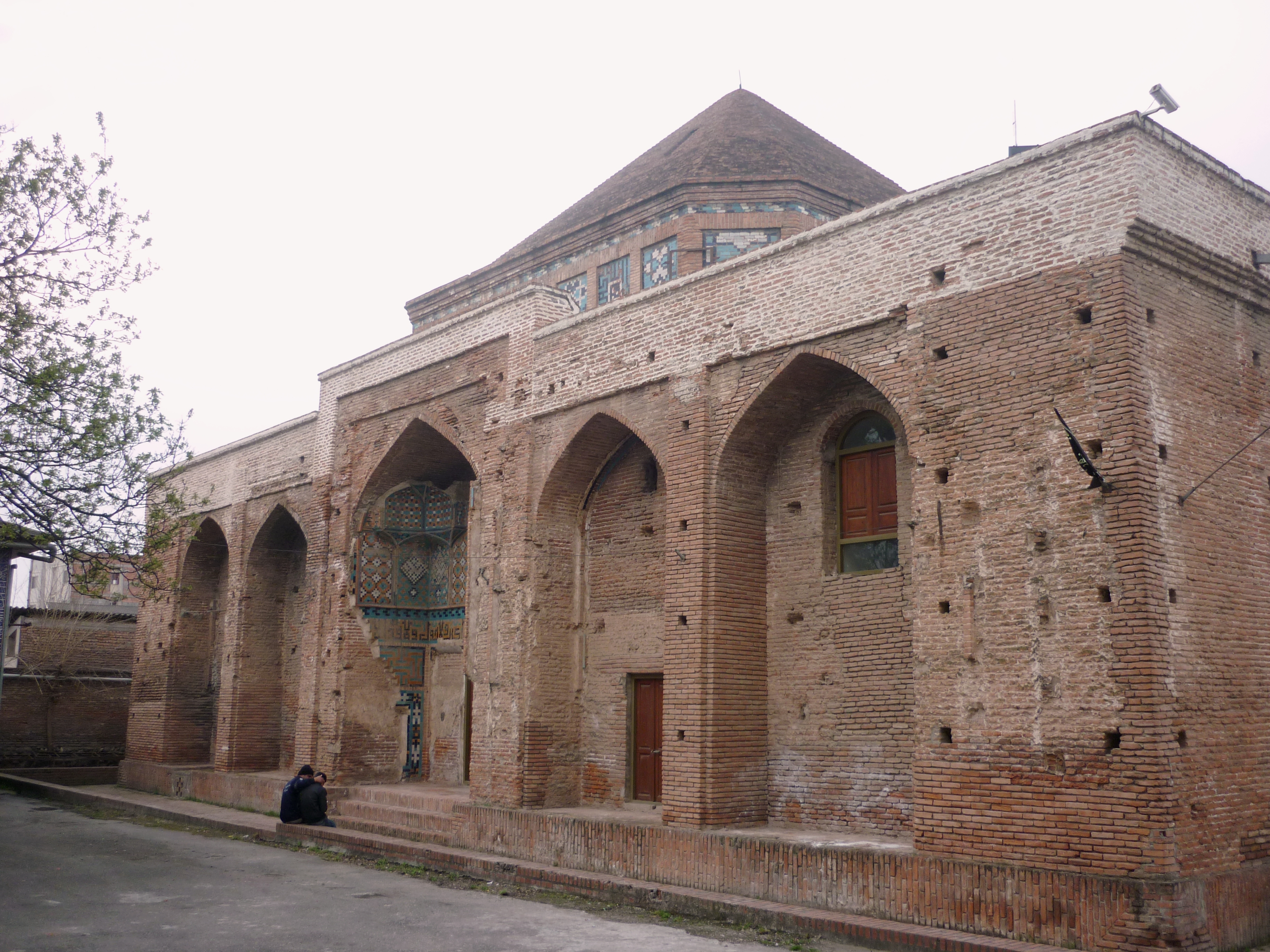
- Mausoleum of Mir Borozg

- Location of the mausoleum in Iran

Religion
- Affiliation: Islam
- Ecclesiastical or organisational status: Mausoleum and imamzadeh
- Status: Active

Location
- Location: Sabzeh Meydan Square, Amol, Mazandaran province
- Country: Iran
- Interactive map of Mausoleum of Mir Borozg
- Coordinates: 36°28′18″N 52°21′06″E

Architecture
- Type: Islamic architecture
- Style: Timurid (prime); Safavid
- Founder: Iskandar-i Shaykhi (prime); Abbas the Great (reconstruction)
- Completed: 8th century AH (14th century CE) (prime); 814 AH (1411/1412 CE) (reconstruction); 1033 AH (1623/1624 CE) (cenotaph)
- Demolished: 795 AH (1392/1393 CE) (prime)

Specifications
- Monument: One: Mir-i Buzurg
- Materials: Bricks; mortar; tiles
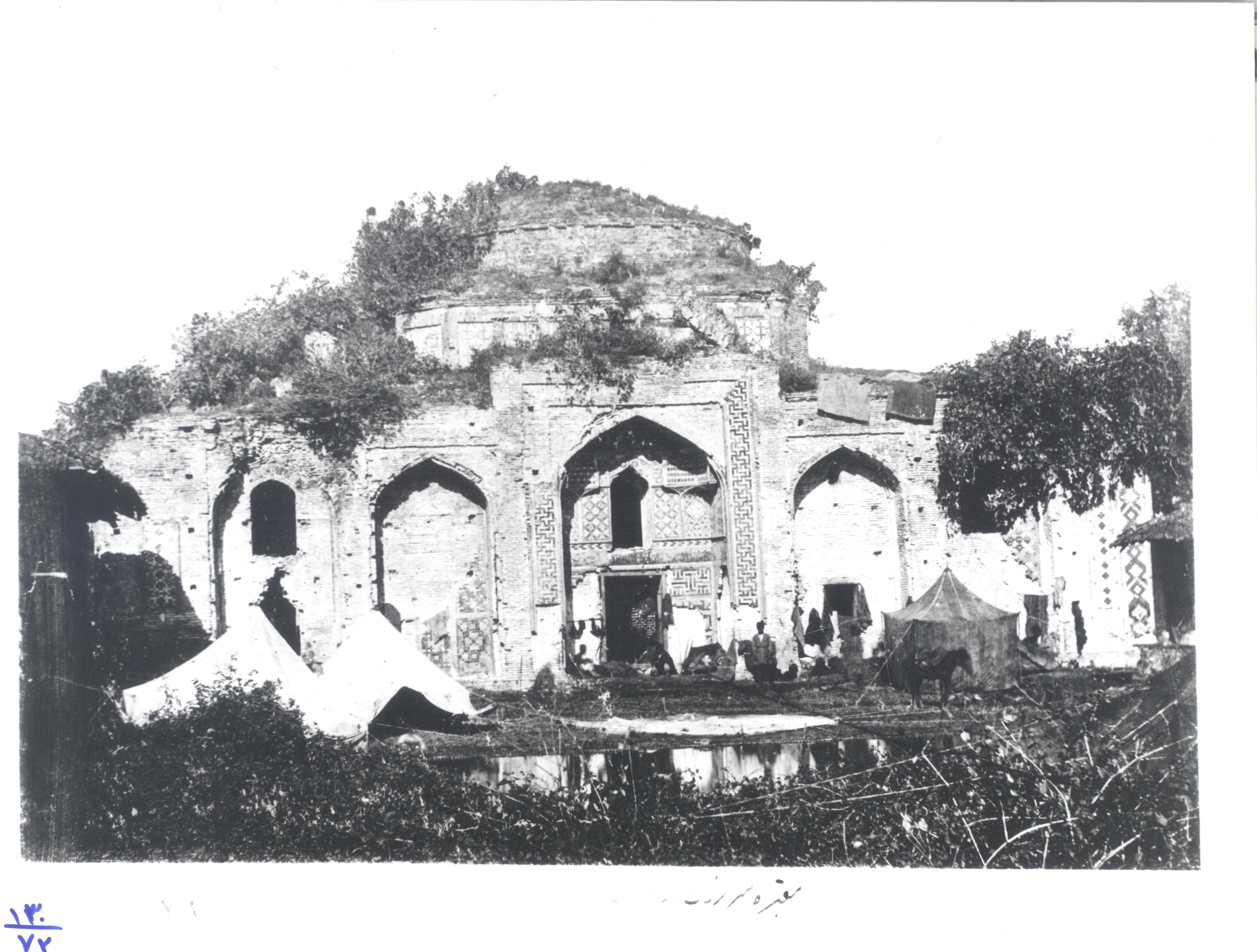
- The mausoleum in 1875, photographed by Aqa Reza Akasbashi

Iran National Heritage List
- Official name: Mausoleum of Mir Bozorg
- Type: Mausoleum
- Designated: 1932
- Reference no.: 59
- Conservation organization: Cultural Heritage, Handicrafts and Tourism Organization of Iran

The Mausoleum of Mir Bozorg (Persian: مشهد میربزرگ), also known as the Mir Bozorg Marashi Tomb, and the Mashhad Mir Bozorg, is a mausoleum and imamzadeh complex located in Sabzeh Meydan Square, Amol, in the province of Mazandaran, Iran. The mausoleum was dedicated to the founder of the reign Marashis, Qavam al-Din Marashi, also known as Mir-i Buzurg.

The mausoleum was added to the Iran National Heritage List on 6 January 1932 and is administered by the Cultural Heritage, Handicrafts and Tourism Organization of Iran.

== Overview ==
The complex was built on the site of an 8th-century AH (14th-century CE) structure that was commissioned by Iskandar-i Shaykhi, during the Timurid era, and was demolished in 795 AH (1392/1393 CE). Abbas the Great commissioned the current structure, with a square floorpan, in 814 AH (1411/1412 CE).

With the addition of a cenotaph in 1033 AH (1623/1624 CE), the current structure remains relatively unaltered; and includes a museum and a library.

== Gallery ==
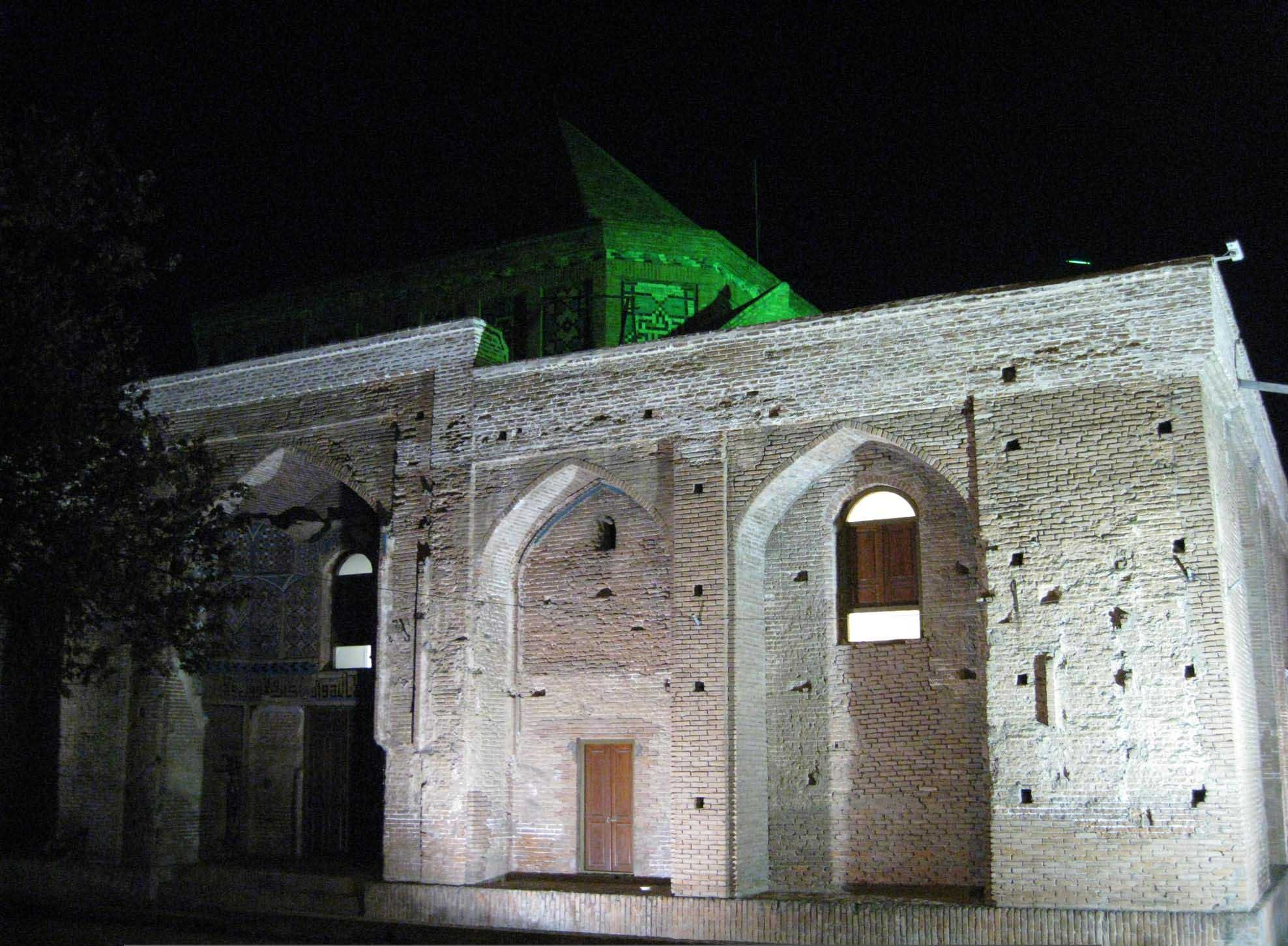
The mausoleum at night

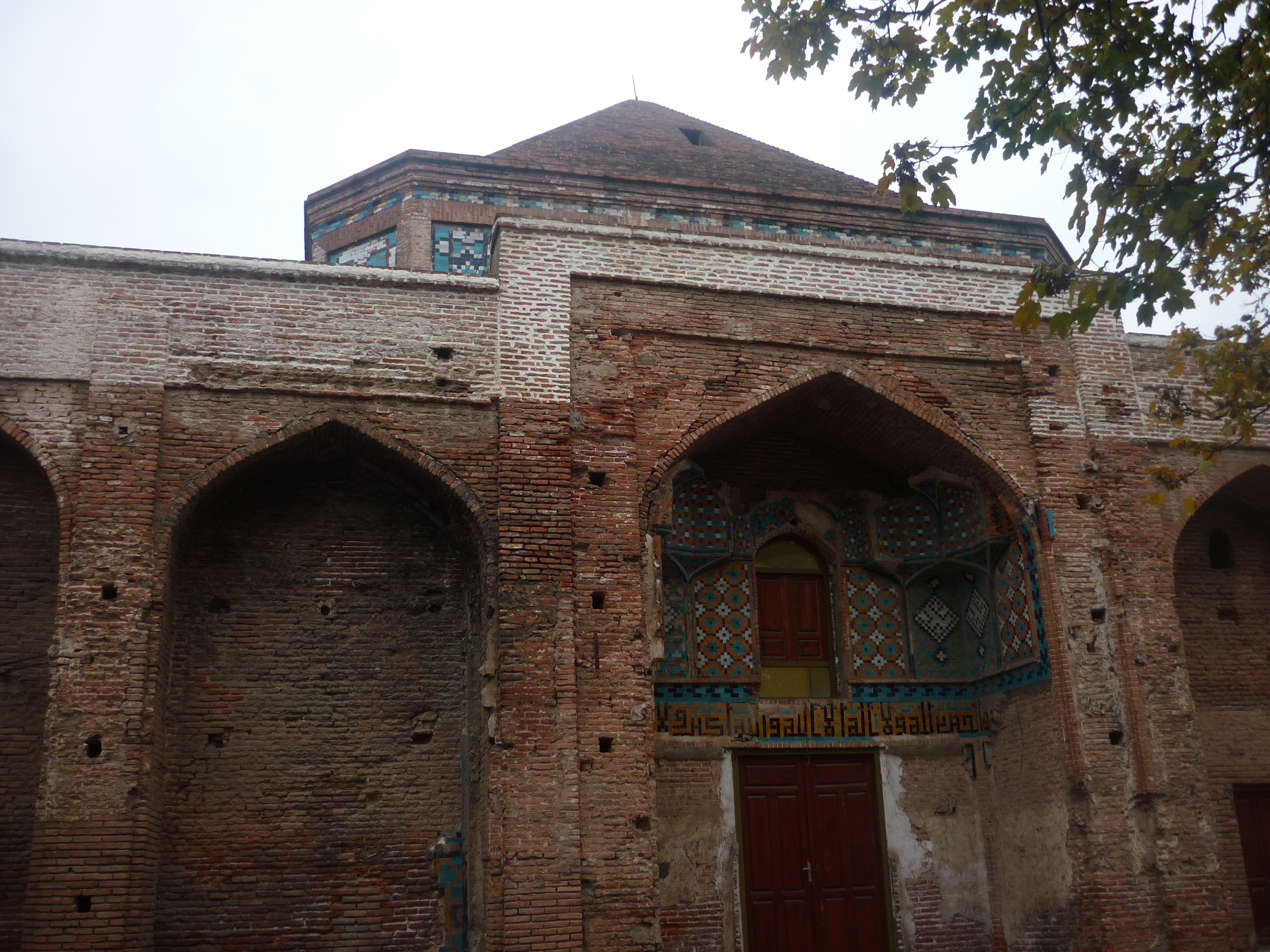
The mausoleum during the day

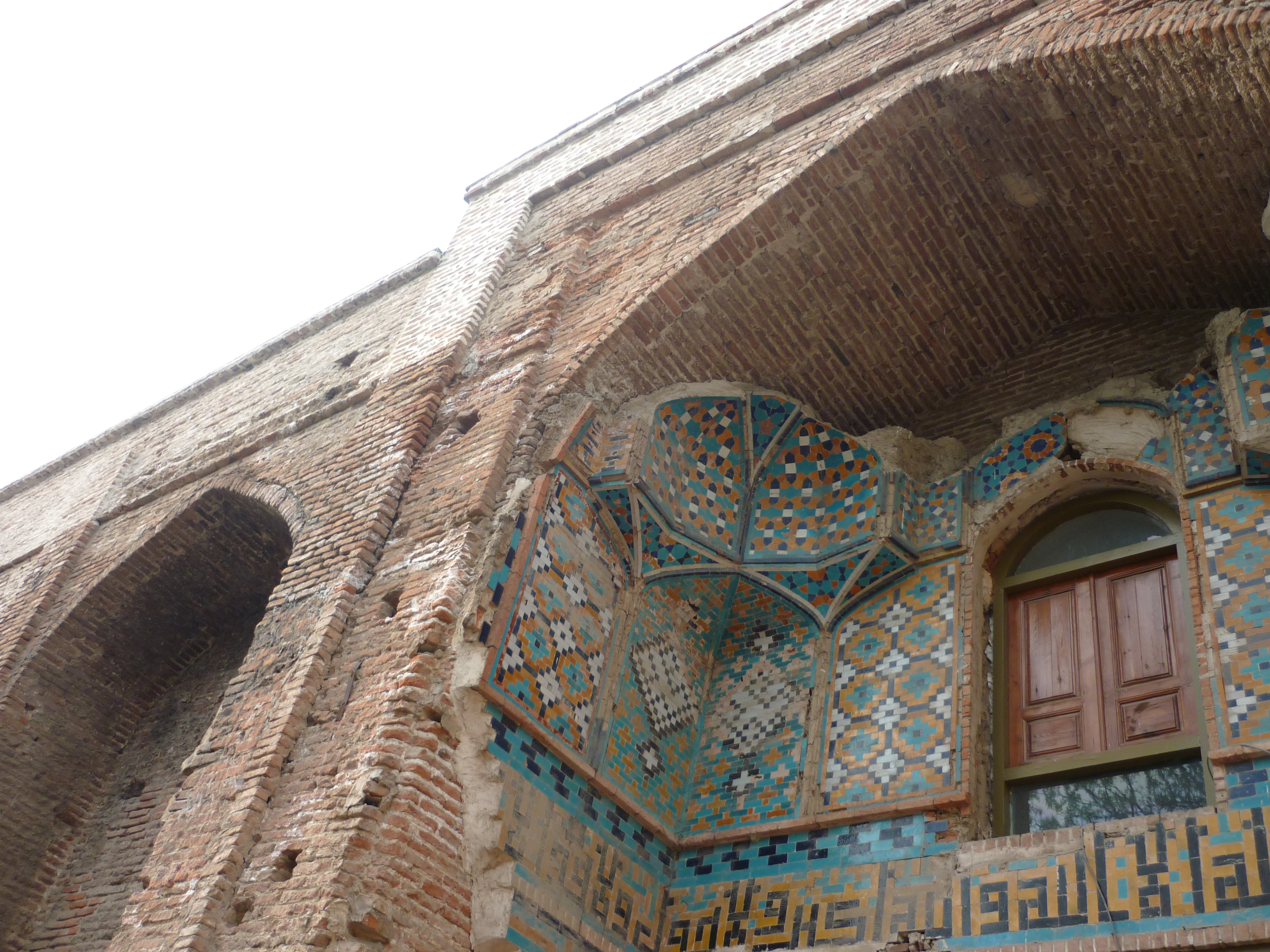
View of the front entrance

== See also ==
- List of imamzadehs in Iran
- List of mausoleums in Iran
- Islam in Iran
