= Kayumars (disambiguation) =

Kayumars is the first man in Persian mythology.

Kayumars may also refer to:

- Shamsuddin Kayumars, a sultan of the Delhi Sultanate
- Kayumarth I, a mediaeval ruler from the Paduspanid dynasty in northwestern Iran
- Kayumarth III, a mediaeval ruler from the Paduspanid dynasty in northwestern Iran
