= Shams al-Muluk Muhammad =

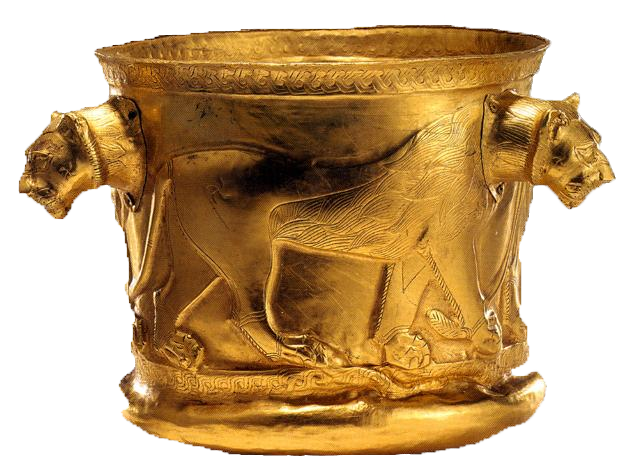

Shams al-Muluk Muhammad was the Baduspanid ruler (ustandar) of Rustamdar from 1312/3 to 1317. He was the son and successor of Kay Khusraw.

A devout ruler, he sought to associate himself with religious scholars, and also laid the foundations to various khanqahs and mosques. He died in 1317 and was succeeded by his brother Nasir al-Din Shahriyar.

== Sources ==
- Madelung, Wilferd (1988). "Baduspanids". Encyclopædia Iranica, online edition, Vol. III, Fasc. 4. New York. pp. 385–391.

Preceded by Kay Khusraw	Ustandar of the Baduspanids; 1312/3–1317	Succeeded by Nasir al-Din Shahriyar
