= Fakhr al-Dawla Shah-Ghazi =

Ostandar of Rustamdar from 1360 to 1379

Fakhr al-Dawla Shah-Ghazi was the Baduspanid ruler (ustandar) of Rustamdar from 1360 to 1379. He is notable for sponsoring the composition of the history chronicle Tarikh-i Ruyan by Awliya Allah Amuli. He died in 1379 and was succeeded by his son Adud al-Dawla Qubad.

== Sources ==
- Ghereghlou, Kioumars (2018). "Bādūsbānids". In Fleet, Kate; Krämer, Gudrun; Matringe, Denis; Nawas, John; Rowson, Everett (eds.). Encyclopaedia of Islam (3rd ed.). Brill Online. ISSN 1873-9830.
- Madelung, Wilferd (1988). "Baduspanids". Encyclopædia Iranica, online edition, Vol. III, Fasc. 4. New York. pp. 385–391.
- Melville, Charles (2000). "The Caspian Provinces: A World Apart Three Local Histories of Mazandaran". Iranian Studies. 33 (1/2): 45–91. doi:10.1080/00210860008701976. JSTOR 4311334. S2CID 161557156. (registration required)

Preceded by Jalal al-Dawla Iskandar	Ustandar of the Baduspanids; 1360–1379	Succeeded by Adud al-Dawla Qubad
