= Kiya Afrasiyab =

First king of the Afrasiyab dynasty (died 1359)

- King of the Afrasiyab dynasty
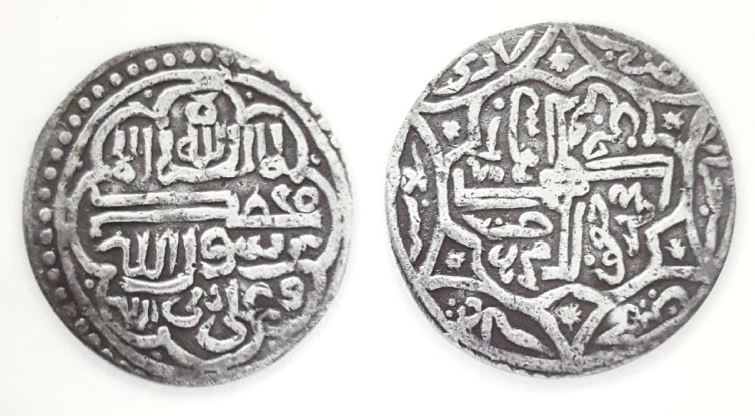
- Coin of Kiya Afrasiyab
- Reign: 1349–1359
- Predecessor: Hasan II (Bavandids)
- Successor: Mir-i Buzurg (Marashis)
- Born: Unknown; Mazandaran
- Died: 1359; Near Amol
- Issue: Iskandar-i Shaykhi
- House: Afrasiyab dynasty
- Father: Hasan Chulabi
- Religion: Twelver Shi'a Islam

Kiya Afrasiyab (Mazandarani/Persian: کیا افراسیاب چلاوی, romanized: Kīā Afrāsīāb), was the founder of the Afrasiyab dynasty, ruling from 1349 to 1359.

== Biography ==
=== Rise to power ===
Afrasiyab was the son of certain Hasan Chulabi, who belonged to the Chulabids, a prominent family of Mazandaran which served the Bavandids. Afrasiyab was the sipahsalar and the brother-in-law of the Bavandid ruler Hasan II (r. 1334-1349).

In 1349, the Bavandid ruler Hasan ordered the execution of one of his most powerful officials, Jalal ibn Ahmad Jal, who was from the powerful Jalali which governed Sari. The execution resulted in a revolt by the nobles of Mazandaran. Hasan then tried to get support from the Chulabids, but the two sons of Afrasiyab murdered Hasan in his bath.

=== Reign ===
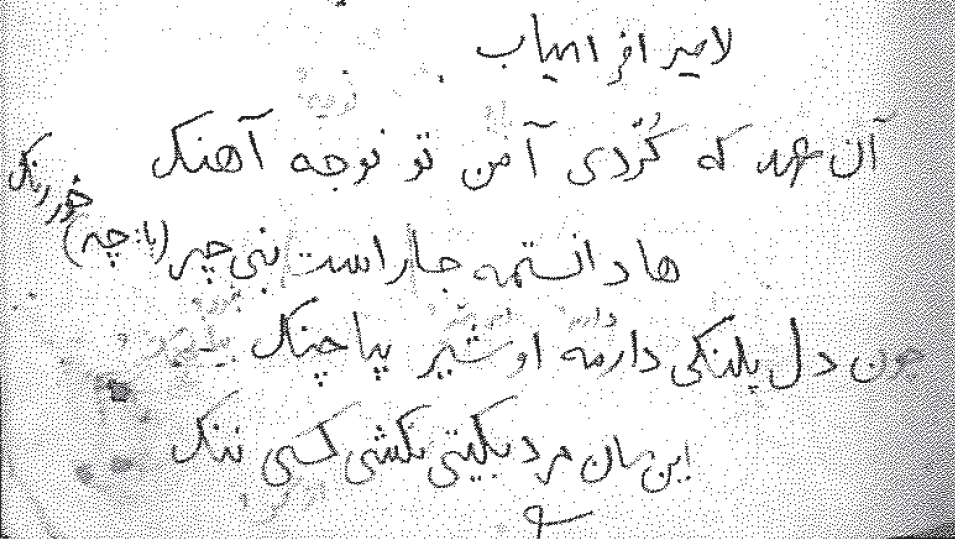
Poem written by Kiya Afrasyiab.

Afrasiyab then gained control of the Bavandid territories, thus marking the end of the Bavand dynasty and the start of the Afrasiyab dynasty. A son of Hasan managed to flee to the court of the Paduspanid ruler Eskandar II, who later tried to restore Bavand rule in Mazandaran, but failed to do so. Afrasiyab also faced another problem; the nobles of Mazandaran did not acknowledge his rule and viewed it as usurpation.

Afrasiyab shortly tried to achieve stability by asking aid from Mir-i Buzurg, a Sayyid dervish from Dabudasht. However, some of Mir-i Buzurg's dervishes acted hostile to Afrasiyab, which made him imprison Mir-i Buzurg and many of his dervishes. However, the supporters of Mir-i Buzurg shortly revolted, and freed him from prison. In 1359, a battle between Afrasiyab and Mir-i Buzurg took place near Amol, where Afrasiyab was defeated and was killed together with his three sons.

Mir-i Buzurg shortly conquered the territories of the Afrasiyab dynasty, and laid foundations to the Marashi dynasty. Afrasiyab had several other sons who tried to restore Afrasiyabid authority in Mazandaran. His son Fakhr al-Din Chulabi murdered one of the sons of Mir-i Buzurg, which resulted in a massacre of most of the Afrasiyabid family. Afrasiyab's other son Iskandar-i Shaykhi, managed with the aid of Timur, to restore Afrasiyabid authority in 1393.

== Sources ==
- Madelung, W. (1984). "ĀL-E BĀVAND (BAVANDIDS)". Encyclopaedia Iranica, Vol. I, Fasc. 7. London u.a.: Routledge & Kegan Paul. pp. 747–753. ISBN 90-04-08114-3.
- Bosworth, C. E. (1984). "ĀL-E AFRĀSĪĀB". Encyclopaedia Iranica, Vol. I, Fasc. 7. London u.a.: Routledge & Kegan Paul. pp. 742–743. Archived from the original on 2014-02-20.

Regnal titles
Preceded by Hasan II (Bavandids)	Afrasiyabid ruler 1349–1359	Succeeded by Mir-i Buzurg (Marashis)
