= Nasir al-Din Shahriyar =

Baduspanid ruler of Rustamdar in present-day Iran

Ustandar of Rustamdar
- In office 1317–1325
- Preceded by: Shams al-Muluk Muhammad
- Succeeded by: Taj al-Dawla Ziyar

Personal details
- Died: 1325
- Relatives: Shams al-Muluk Muhammad (brother); Shah-Kaykhusraw (brother-in-law)
- Dynasty: Baduspanid

Nasir al-Din Shahriyar was the Baduspanid ruler (ustandar) of Rustamdar from 1317 to 1325. He was the brother and successor of Shams al-Muluk Muhammad.

During his reign, Shahriyar cut all contact with the Mongol Ilkhanate, and supported his brother-in-law, the Bavandid ruler Shah-Kaykhusraw (r. 1310–1328) against the Mongol commander Mu'min and his son Kutlushah, and the powerful Kiya Jalali family of Sari. Shahriyar was murdered in 1325 by his nephew Iskandar at the instigation of brother Taj al-Dawla Ziyar, who took the throne.

== Sources ==
- Madelung, Wilferd (1988). "Baduspanids". Encyclopædia Iranica, online edition, Vol. III, Fasc. 4. New York: Encyclopædia Iranica Foundation. pp. 385–391.

Preceded by Shams al-Muluk Muhammad	Ustandar of the Baduspanids; 1317–1325	Succeeded by Taj al-Dawla Ziyar
