= Ka'us III =

Ka'us III (Persian: کاووس), was the fourth ruler of the Paduspanid branch of Kojur. He was the son and successor of Ashraf ibn Taj al-Dawla.

== Biography ==
During his reign, relations with the Kia'id Khan Ahmad Khan flourished, and by 1514 family ties were between the Paduspanids and Kia'ids. Nine years later, Ka'us, along with the Marashiyan ruler visited the court of the Safavid king Ismail I. Not much more is known about Ka'us; he died after being poisoned by his son Kayumarth III, whom Ka'us had imprisoned for unknown reasons.

== Sources ==
- Madelung, W. (2010). "BADUSPANIDS". Encyclopaedia Iranica, Online Edition.
- Madelung, W. (1975). "The Minor Dynasties of Northern Iran". In Frye, R.N. (ed.). The Cambridge History of Iran, Volume 4: From the Arab Invasion to the Saljuqs. Cambridge: Cambridge University Press. pp. 198–249. ISBN 978-0-521-20093-6.
- Frye, R.N. (1975). "The Saljuq and Mongol periods". In Frye, R.N. (ed.). The Cambridge History of Iran, Volume 5: The Iranian world. Cambridge: Cambridge University Press. pp. 1–659. ISBN 0-521-20093-8.

Preceded by Ashraf ibn Taj al-Dawla	Paduspanid ruler 1507–1543	Succeeded by Kayumarth III
