= Luhrasp =

Ruler of the Afrasiyabids in c. 1475

Luhrasp (Persian: لهراسپ), was ruler of the Afrasiyab dynasty in ca. 1475. He was the son and successor of Kiya Husayn I. Not much more is known about him; he was later succeeded by his grandson Kiya Husayn II at an unknown date.

== Sources ==
- Bosworth, C. E. (1984). "ĀL-E AFRĀSĪĀB". Encyclopaedia Iranica, Vol. I, Fasc. 7. London u.a.: Routledge & Kegan Paul. pp. 742–743. Archived from the original on 2014-02-20.

Preceded by Kiya Husayn I	Afrasiyabid ruler ca. 1475?	Succeeded by Kiya Husayn II
