= Kayumarth III =

Kayumarth III (Persian: کیومرث), was the fifth ruler of the Paduspanid branch of Kojur. He was the son and successor of Ka'us III.

== Biography ==
During the reign of Kayumarth's father, Ka'us III, the latter had Kayumarth imprisoned for unknown reasons. After eighteen years, Kayumarth managed to flee from prison, and had his father poisoned. Kayumarth's uncle, Bisotun ibn Ashraf, with the support of the Paduspanid noblemen, then ascended the Paduspanid throne. However, the people of Mazandaran quickly rose in revolt against him, and had him deposed in favor of Kayumarth. During Kayumarth's reign, his daughter married the Marashiyan Mir Qewam al-Din Marashi. Kayumarth died in 1555, and was succeeded by his brother Jahangir II.

== Sources ==
- Madelung, W. (2010). "BADUSPANIDS". Encyclopaedia Iranica, Online Edition.
- Madelung, W. (1975). "The Minor Dynasties of Northern Iran". In Frye, R.N. (ed.). The Cambridge History of Iran, Volume 4: From the Arab Invasion to the Saljuqs. Cambridge: Cambridge University Press. pp. 198–249. ISBN 978-0-521-20093-6.
- Frye, R.N. (1975). "The Saljuq and Mongol periods". In Frye, R.N. (ed.). The Cambridge History of Iran, Volume 5: The Iranian world. Cambridge: Cambridge University Press. pp. 1–659. ISBN 0-521-20093-8.

Preceded by Ka'us III	Paduspanid ruler 1543–1555	Succeeded by Jahangir II
