= Jahangir III =

16th century ruler of the Paduspanid branch of Nur

Jahangir III (Persian: جهانگیر), was the last ruler of the Paduspanid branch of Nur. He was the son and successor of Sultan Aziz. In 1593/94, he traveled to the court of the Safavid Shah Abbas I, where he handed over his domains to him, and spent the rest of his life in a property near Saveh which Abbas had given to him.

== Sources ==
- Madelung, W. (2010). "BADUSPANIDS". Encyclopaedia Iranica, Online Edition.
- Madelung, W. (1975). "The Minor Dynasties of Northern Iran". In Frye, R.N. (ed.). The Cambridge History of Iran, Volume 4: From the Arab Invasion to the Saljuqs. Cambridge: Cambridge University Press. pp. 198–249. ISBN 978-0-521-20093-6.
- Frye, R.N. (1975). "The Saljuq and Mongol periods". In Frye, R.N. (ed.). The Cambridge History of Iran, Volume 5: The Iranian world. Cambridge: Cambridge University Press. pp. 1–659. ISBN 0-521-20093-8.

Preceded by Sultan Aziz	Paduspanid ruler 1586–1593/94	Succeeded by Safavid rule
