= Kiya Husayn II =

Afrasiyabid ruler

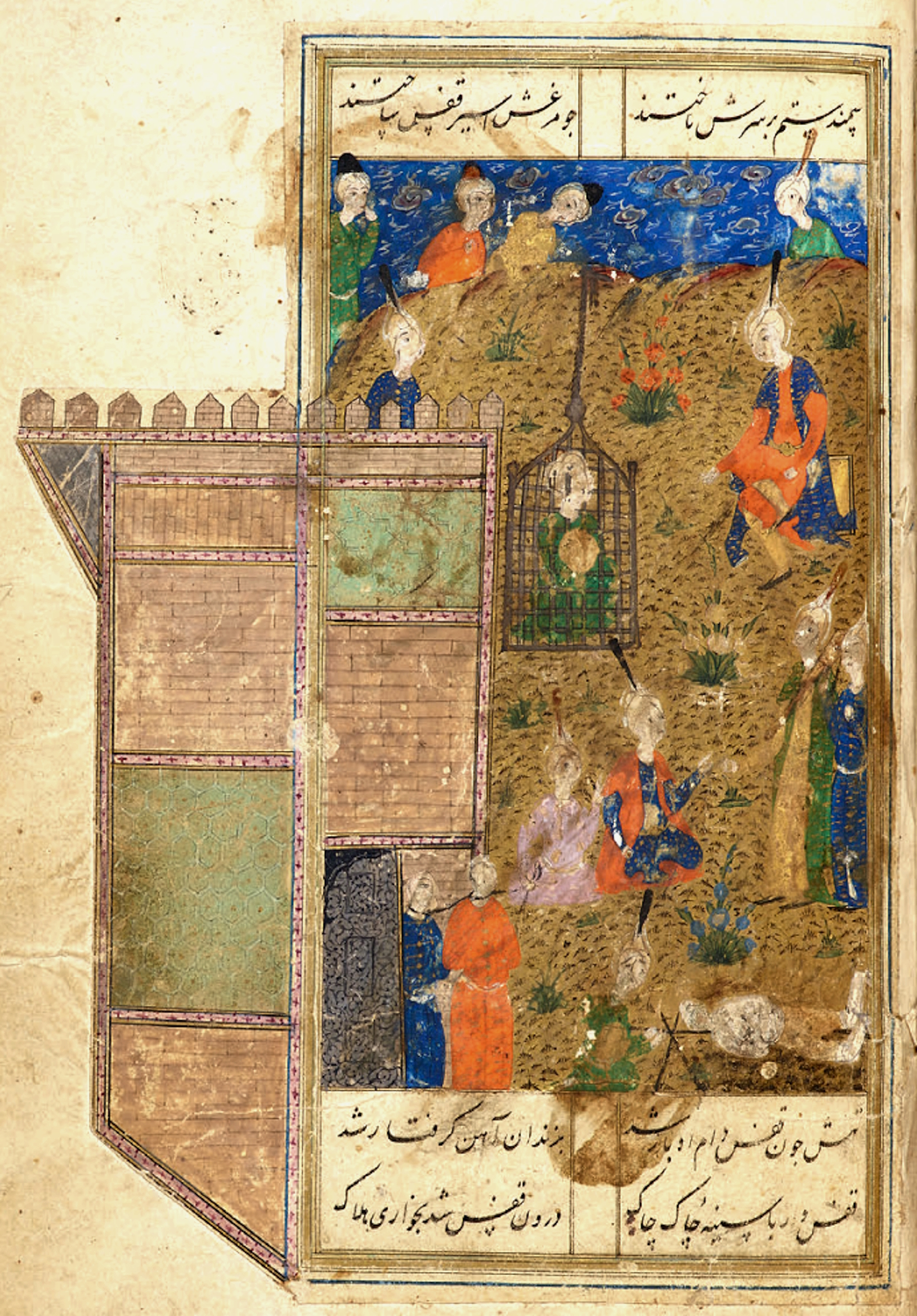
Husayn Kiya Chulavi in a cage, while the body of Murad Beg Jahanshahlu, an Aq Qoyunlu general, roasts on a spit in 1504 at the hand of the Safavids. Shahnama-yi i Ismaʻil, MS. Elliot 328, Bodleian Library, Oxford, fol. 91a.

Kiya Husayn II (Persian: کیا حسین), was the last ruler of the Afrasiyab dynasty, ruling from the late 15th-century till his death in 1504. He was the grandson and successor of Luhrasp.

== Biography ==
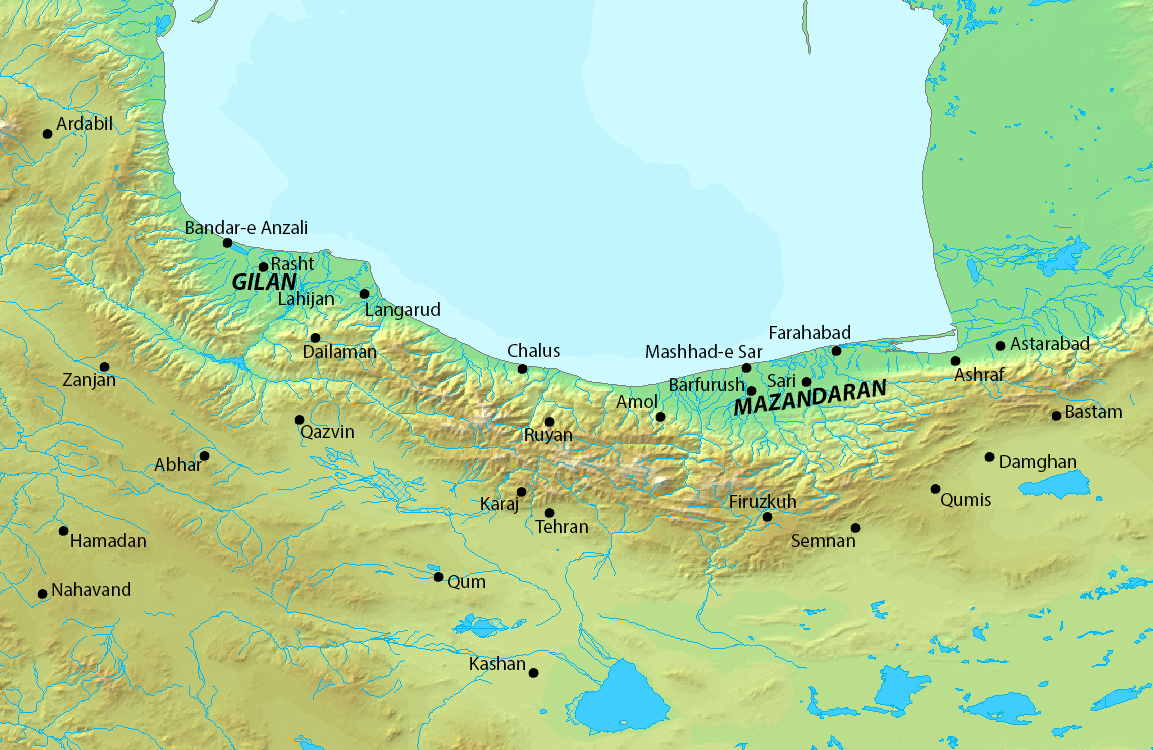
Map of northern Iran.

He ruled over a large part of western Mazandaran, and districts of Firuzkuh, Damavand, and Hari-rud. During the dissolution of the Aq Qoyunlu confederation, Kiya Husayn II expanded his rule from western into central Iran, where he captured Ray and Semnan. He also defeated Mohammad Hosayn Mirza, who was the Timurid governor of Astarabad. It was probably around this period that Kiya Husayn II married the Aq Qoyunlu princess Tajlu Khanum.

He later became the enemy of the Safavid shah Ismail I (r. 1501-1524), whom he may have seen as a rival for the command over the Shi'ites in Iran. In 1504, Kiya Husayn II's territories was invaded by Ismail I, who seized the strongholds of Gol-e Khan and Firuzkuh, and surrounded Kiya Husayn II in Osta, who was shortly captured. However, the latter committed suicide—his body was burned at Isfahan in front its inhabitants, whilst his followers in Mazandaran were slaughtered. Ismail I took Tajlu Khanum into his harem, where she became his favorite wife.

== Sources ==
- Bosworth, C. E. (1984). "ĀL-E AFRĀSĪĀB". Encyclopaedia Iranica, Vol. I, Fasc. 7. London u.a.: Routledge & Kegan Paul. pp. 742–743. Archived from the original on 2014-02-20.
- Savory, Roger (1998). "ESMĀʿĪL I ṢAFAWĪ". Encyclopaedia Iranica, Vol. VIII, Fasc. 6. pp. 628–636.

Preceded by Luhrasp	Afrasiyabid ruler ?-1504	Succeeded by Ismail I (Safavid rule)
