= Jahangir IV =

16th century ruler of the Paduspanid branch of Kojur

Jahangir IV (Persian: جهانگیر), was the last ruler of the Paduspanid branch of Kojur. He was the son and successor of Sultan Mohammad ibn Jahangir.

== Biography ==
In 1593, Jahangir arrived to the court of Abbas I of Persia, and established good relations with him. However, during a festival in Qazvin, Jahangir killed two prominent Safavid nobles. This made Abbas invade his domains in 1598, where he besieged Kojur. Jahangir managed to flee, but was captured and killed by a Pro-Safavid Paduspanid named Hasan Lavasani, marking the end of the Paduspanid dynasty.

== Sources ==
- Madelung, W. (2010). "BADUSPANIDS". Encyclopaedia Iranica, Online Edition.
- Madelung, W. (1975). "The Minor Dynasties of Northern Iran". In Frye, R.N. (ed.). The Cambridge History of Iran, Volume 4: From the Arab Invasion to the Saljuqs. Cambridge: Cambridge University Press. pp. 198–249. ISBN 978-0-521-20093-6.
- Frye, R.N. (1975). "The Saljuq and Mongol periods". In Frye, R.N. (ed.). The Cambridge History of Iran, Volume 5: The Iranian world. Cambridge: Cambridge University Press. pp. 1–659. ISBN 0-521-20093-8.

| Preceded by Sultan Mohammad ibn Jahangir | Paduspanid ruler 1590–1598 | Succeeded by Safavid rule AbbasI Safavid |
