= Shahriyar III ibn Jamshid =

Shahriyar III ibn Jamshid was the Baduspanid ruler of Ruyan and Rustamdar from 937 to 949. He belonged to a distant branch of the family, descended from Afridun ibn Karan. After a period of instability and dynastic struggles, Shahriyar emerged victorious and took over the throne, thus establishing a new line known as the Shahriyarids, succeeding the previous Afridunids. The new line notably wielded the pre-Islamic title of ustandar, originally an administrative title of provincial governors under the Sasanian Empire.

== Sources ==
- Ghereghlou, Kioumars (2018). "Bādūsbānids". In Fleet, Kate; Krämer, Gudrun; Matringe, Denis; Nawas, John; Rowson, Everett (eds.). Encyclopaedia of Islam (3rd ed.). Brill Online. ISSN 1873-9830.
