= Baduspan I =

- Ispahbad of Ruyan
- Reign: 665-694
- Predecessor: Gil Gavbara
- Successor: Khurzad ibn Baduspan
- Died: 694
- House: Baduspanids
- Father: Gil Gavbara
- Religion: Zoroastrianism

Baduspan I or Padusban I (Persian: پادوسبان یکم) was the first Ispahbad and the founder of Baduspanid state. He reigned approximately from 665 to 694.
