= Taj al-Dawla Ziyar =

Taj al-Dawla Ziyar (Persian: تاج‌الدوله زیار) was the Baduspanid ruler (ustandar) of Rustamdar from 1325 to 1333. He succeeded to the throne after instigating the murder of his predecessor and brother Nasir al-Din Shahriyar through his son Iskandar.

He defeated his brother Izz al-Dawla, who opposed him and had sought support from the Mongol Ilkhanate. He died in 1333 in Kavir, and was succeeded by his son Jalal al-Dawla Iskandar.

== Sources ==
- Madelung, Wilferd (1988). "Baduspanids". Encyclopædia Iranica, online edition, Vol. III, Fasc. 4. New York. pp. 385–391.

Preceded by Nasir al-Din Shahriyar	Ustandar of the Baduspanids; 1325–1333	Succeeded by Jalal al-Dawla Iskandar
