= Kiya Husayn I =

Afrasiyab ruler

Kiya Husayn I (Persian: کیا حسین), was the third ruler of the Afrasiyab dynasty, ruling from 1403 till an unknown date. He was the son and successor of Iskandar-i Shaykhi. Kiya Husayn was later succeeded by his son, Luhrasp.

== Sources ==
- Bosworth, C. E. (1984). "ĀL-E AFRĀSĪĀB". Encyclopaedia Iranica, Vol. I, Fasc. 7. London u.a.: Routledge & Kegan Paul. pp. 742–743. Archived from the original on 2014-02-20.

Preceded by Iskandar-i Shaykhi	Afrasiyabid ruler 1403-?	Succeeded by Luhrasp
