= Jalal al-Dawla Iskandar =

Jalal al-Dawla Iskandar was the ruler (ustandar) of the Baduspanids from 1333 to 1360. Under his rule, the kingdom reached its zenith. Taking advantage of the collapse of the Mongol Ilkhanate in 1335, he expanded his rule into the southern Alborz, ruling an area stretching from Qazvin to Simnan. In 1346, he founded the town of Kojur and conquered the region of Daylam. In 1360, he was mortally wounded by his bodyguard during a ruckus at a drinking party. He died three days later, and was succeeded by his brother Fakhr al-Dawla Shah-Ghazi.

== Biography ==
Map of the Baduspanid realm in 1346 under Jalal al-Dawla Iskandar

A son of Taj al-Dawla Ziyar (r. 1325–1333), Jalal al-Dawla Iskandar played a key-role in his father's accession to the throne, by murdering his uncle, the ustandar Nasir al-Din Shahriyar (r. 1317–1325). When Taj al-Dawla Ziyar ascended the throne, he made Iskandar the ruler of Kalarrustaq. Iskandar became the new ustandar after his father's death in 1333, entrusting his brother Fakhr al-Dawla Shah-Ghazi with rule of Natelrustaq. He took advantage of the collapse of the Mongol Ilkhanate in 1335, expanding his rule into the southern Alborz, ruling an area stretching from Qazvin to Simnan.

In 1344, the Sarbadar ruler Wajih ad-Din Mas'ud sought to increase his territorial domains, and thus in 1344 invaded the domains of the Bavandid ruler Hasan II (r. 1334–1349) and Iskandar. When the Sarbadars advanced on Amol, Hasan decided to abandon the city. He then turned around and defeated the Sarbadar garrison at Sari, cutting off Mas'ud's line of retreat. Despite this, Mas'ud decided to press on. When Hasan attacked his rear, however, and Iskandar met him at his front, Mas'ud was surrounded. The Sarbadars were decimated, and Mas'ud was captured and executed by Iskandar. In 1346, Iskandar founded the town of Kojur and conquered the region of Daylam.

In the late 1340s, Hasan II had his vizier Kiya Jalal ibn Ahmad Jal executed, which alienated the latter's family—the powerful Kiya Jalili, which controlled Sari. This had many outraged, and made Jalilids enter an alliance with Iskandar. Together, they attacked Amul, forcing Hasan II to surrender. Iskandar treated him honorably, but another powerful family–the Chalabis–distanced themselves from him. Hasan II's wife (the sister of the Chalabi general Kiya Afrasiyab) accused him of seducing his stepdaughter and gained a (fatwa) from Amul which had him convicted. Two of Kiya Afrasiyab's sons, Ali Kiya and Muhammad Kiya, murdered Hasan I on 17 April 1349, thus marking the end of the ancient Bavandid line, which stretched back to the pre-Islamic era. The sons of Hasan II fled to Iskandar, who attempted to restore Bavandid rule, but suffered a defeat outside Amul.

In 1360, Iskandar was mortally wounded by his bodyguard during a ruckus at a drinking party. He died three days later, and was succeeded by Fakhr al-Dawla Shah-Ghazi.

== Sources ==
- Bosworth, C. E. (1984). "Āl-e Afrāsīāb". Encyclopædia Iranica, online edition, Vol. I, Fasc. 7. New York. pp. 742–743.
- Ghereghlou, Kioumars (2018). "Bādūsbānids". In Fleet, Kate; Krämer, Gudrun; Matringe, Denis; Nawas, John; Rowson, Everett (eds.). Encyclopaedia of Islam (3rd ed.). Brill Online. ISSN 1873-9830.
- Madelung, Wilferd (1984). "Āl-e Bāvand". Encyclopædia Iranica, online edition, Vol. I, Fasc. 7. New York. pp. 747–753.
- Madelung, Wilferd (1988). "Baduspanids". Encyclopædia Iranica, online edition, Vol. III, Fasc. 4. New York. pp. 385–391.
- Yavari, Neguin (2015). "Afrāsiyābids". In Fleet, Kate; Krämer, Gudrun; Matringe, Denis; Nawas, John; Rowson, Everett (eds.). Encyclopaedia of Islam (3rd ed.). Brill Online. ISSN 1873-9830.

| Preceded by Taj al-Dawla Ziyar | Ustandar of the Baduspanids; 1333–1360 | Succeeded by Fakhr al-Dawla Shah-Ghazi |
