= Sayyid Ali Sari =

Sayyid Ali Sari (Persian: سید علی ساری) was the Mar'ashi ruler of Amul and Sari from 1406 to 1417. He was a son of Kamal al-Din I, and was succeeded by his son Sayyid Murtada.

== Sources ==
- Calmard, J (1991). "Marʿas̲h̲is". In Bosworth, C. E.; van Donzel, E. & Pellat, Ch. (eds.). The Encyclopaedia of Islam, Second Edition. Volume VI: Mahk–Mid. Leiden: E. J. Brill. ISBN 978-90-04-08112-3.

Preceded by Timurid rule	Mar'ashi ruler 1406–1417	Succeeded by Sayyid Murtada
