= Zahir al-Din Mar'ashi =

Iranian historian

- ظهیرالدین مرعشی آملی
- Born: 1412 CE
- Died: after 1489 CE
- Occupations: Historian, Commander, Diplomat

Academic work
- Era: Medieval Islamic period
- Main interests: History of Tabarestan
- Notable works: Several books on the history of Tabarestan

Zahir al-Din Mar'ashi Amoli (Persian: ظهیرالدین مرعشی آملی) was a Persian commander, diplomat and historian. He is the author of several books on the history of Tabarestan. He was born in 812 AH (1412 AD) and died after 894 AH (1489 AD). He was from Mar'ashi family, an originally seyyed family in Tabarestan who dominated the region from the later 8th/14th century until the province's incorporation into Safavid Empire by Abbas I of Persia in 1005/1596. He stemmed from the main branch of Mar'ashis, that of Kamal al-Din ibn Kiwan al-Din. He owned states at Bazargah at Gilan and was employed by Sultan Muhammad II of Kar Kia line in Gilan and then by his son and successor Mirza Ali. He was sent to resolve militarily a succession dispute in adjacent Rustamdar and he led other expeditions, including an unsuccessful siege of Nur in 868/1463.
