= Afridun ibn Karan =

Baduspanid prince

Afridun ibn Karan was a Baduspanid prince, who came from a collateral line of the family, known as the Afridunids. He seized the throne in 884, thus overthrowing the main branch of the family descended from Baduspan I and initiating the rule of the Afridunids, who would rule until 937, when Shahriyar III ibn Jamshid of the Shahriyarid branch established his rule.

== Sources ==
- Ghereghlou, Kioumars (2018). "Bādūsbānids". In Fleet, Kate; Krämer, Gudrun; Matringe, Denis; Nawas, John; Rowson, Everett (eds.). Encyclopaedia of Islam (3rd ed.). Brill Online. ISSN 1873-9830.
