= Larijan (district) =

Larijan was the name of a district that encompassed the entire area covered by the Lar River in Mazandaran, a region on the Caspian coast of northern Iran. The mythical Iranian king Fereydun was said to have been born in a village in Larijan.

== Sources ==
- Calmard, J (1986). "Lār and Lārīd̲j̲ān". In Bosworth, C. E.; van Donzel, E.; Lewis, B. & Pellat, Ch. (eds.). The Encyclopaedia of Islam, Second Edition. Volume V: Khe–Mahi. Leiden: E. J. Brill. ISBN 978-90-04-07819-2.
- Floor, Willem M. (2008). Titles and Emoluments in Safavid Iran: A Third Manual of Safavid Administration, by Mirza Naqi Nasiri. Washington, DC: Mage Publishers. ISBN 978-1933823232.
- Melville, Charles (2020). The Timurid Century: The Idea of Iran Vol.9. University of Cambridge, English: Bloomsbury Publishing. ISBN 978-1838606886.
