= Natal, Iran =

Natal ناتل
- Village
- Location within Iran
- Coordinates: 36°30′05″N 52°01′21″E
- Country: Iran
- Province: Mazandaran
- County: Nur
- Bakhsh: Central
- Rural District: Natel Kenar-e Olya

Population (2006)
  - Total: 75
- Time zone: UTC+3:30 (IRST)
  - Summer (DST): UTC+4:30 (IRDT)

Natal (Persian: ناتل, also Romanized as Nātal and Nātel) is a village in Natel Kenar-e Olya Rural District, in the Central District of Nur County, Mazandaran province, Iran. At the 2006 census, its population was 75, in 21 families. It is located about 6 km southwest of the city of Nur.

== History and archaeology ==
At the time of the Abbasid Caliphate, Natel was one of the major cities in Tabaristan and had a military garrison. It was known in medieval sources as Nātil or Nātilah. Three archaeological excavations were conducted under Abdolreza Mohajerinejad in 2008, 2010, and 2016. Over 2,000 pieces of pottery were uncovered; most of them were dated to the 3rd through 6th centuries AH (roughly the 9th-12th centuries CE). Pottery samples dating from the Ilkhanid and Timurid periods was much rarer. Hanie Hossein-Nia Amirkolaei et al. described the pottery samples found at Natel as having "relatively good production quality and strength, but a lower level in terms of manufacturing technique and diversity of motifs".
