= Mianrud, Rudsar =

Mianrud ميانرود
- Village
- Location within Iran
- Coordinates: 36°42′36″N 50°22′21″E
- Country: Iran
- Province: Gilan
- County: Rudsar
- Bakhsh: Rahimabad
- Rural District: Siyarastaq Yeylaq

Population (2006)
  - Total: 44
- Time zone: UTC+3:30 (IRST)
  - Summer (DST): UTC+4:30 (IRDT)

Mianrud (Persian: ميانرود, also Romanized as Mīānrūd) is a village in Siyarastaq Yeylaq Rural District, Rahimabad District, Rudsar County, Gilan Province, Iran. At the 2006 census, its population was 44, in 13 families.
