= Hasan II (Bavandid ruler) =

Final king of the Bavand dynasty (1334 to 1349)

- King of Mazandaran
- Reign: 1334–1349
- Predecessor: Sharaf al-Muluk
- Successor: Kiya Afrasiyab (Afrasiyabids)
- Died: 1349
- Dynasty: Bavand dynasty
- Father: Shah-Kaykhusraw

Hasan II (Persian: حسن), also known as Fakhr al-Dawla Hasan (فخر الدوله حسن), was the last ruler of the Bavand dynasty from 1334 until his murder in 1349. He was the brother and successor of Sharaf al-Muluk.

== Reign ==
In 1344, the Sarbadar ruler Wajih ad-Din Mas'ud, sought to increase his territorial domains, and thus in 1344 invaded the domains of Hasan II and the Paduspanid ruler Eskandar II in Mazandaran with several hostile minor dynasties allied against him. When the Sarbadars advanced on Amol, Hasan decided to abandon the city. He then turned around and defeated the Sarbadar garrison at Sari, cutting off Mas'ud's line of retreat. Despite this, Mas'ud decided to press on. When Hasan attacked his rear, however, and Eskandar II met him at his front, Mas'ud was surrounded. The Sarbadars were decimated, and Mas'ud was captured by Eskandar II. He was handed over to the son of one of Togha Temur's former officials who had died fighting the Sarbadars in 1341/1342. Mas'ud was then executed by the latter.

In 1349, Hasan ordered the execution of one of his most powerful officials, Jalal ibn Ahmad Jal, who was from the powerful Jalali family which governed Sari. The execution resulted in a revolt by the nobles of Mazandaran. Hasan then tried to get support from another family of Mazandaran, the Chulabids. However, the two sons of Kiya Afrasiyab, a powerful Chulabi nobleman, murdered Hasan while the latter was in a bath on April 17. Afrasiyab then gained control of the Bavandid territories, thus marking the end of the Bavand dynasty and the start of the Afrasiyab dynasty. A son of Hasan managed to flee to the court of the Paduspanid ruler Eskandar II, who later tried to restore Bavand rule in Mazandaran, but failed to do so.

== Sources ==
- Madelung, W. (1984). "ĀL-E BĀVAND (BAVANDIDS)". Encyclopaedia Iranica, Vol. I, Fasc. 7. London u.a.: Routledge & Kegan Paul. pp. 747–753. ISBN 90-04-08114-3.
- Bosworth, C. E. (1984). "ĀL-E AFRĀSĪĀB". Encyclopaedia Iranica, Vol. I, Fasc. 7. London u.a.: Routledge & Kegan Paul. pp. 742–743.

Regnal titles
Preceded by Sharaf al-Muluk	Bavandid ruler 1334–1349	Succeeded by Kiya Afrasiyab (Afrasiyabids)
