= Mir-i Buzurg =

- Mir of the Marashis
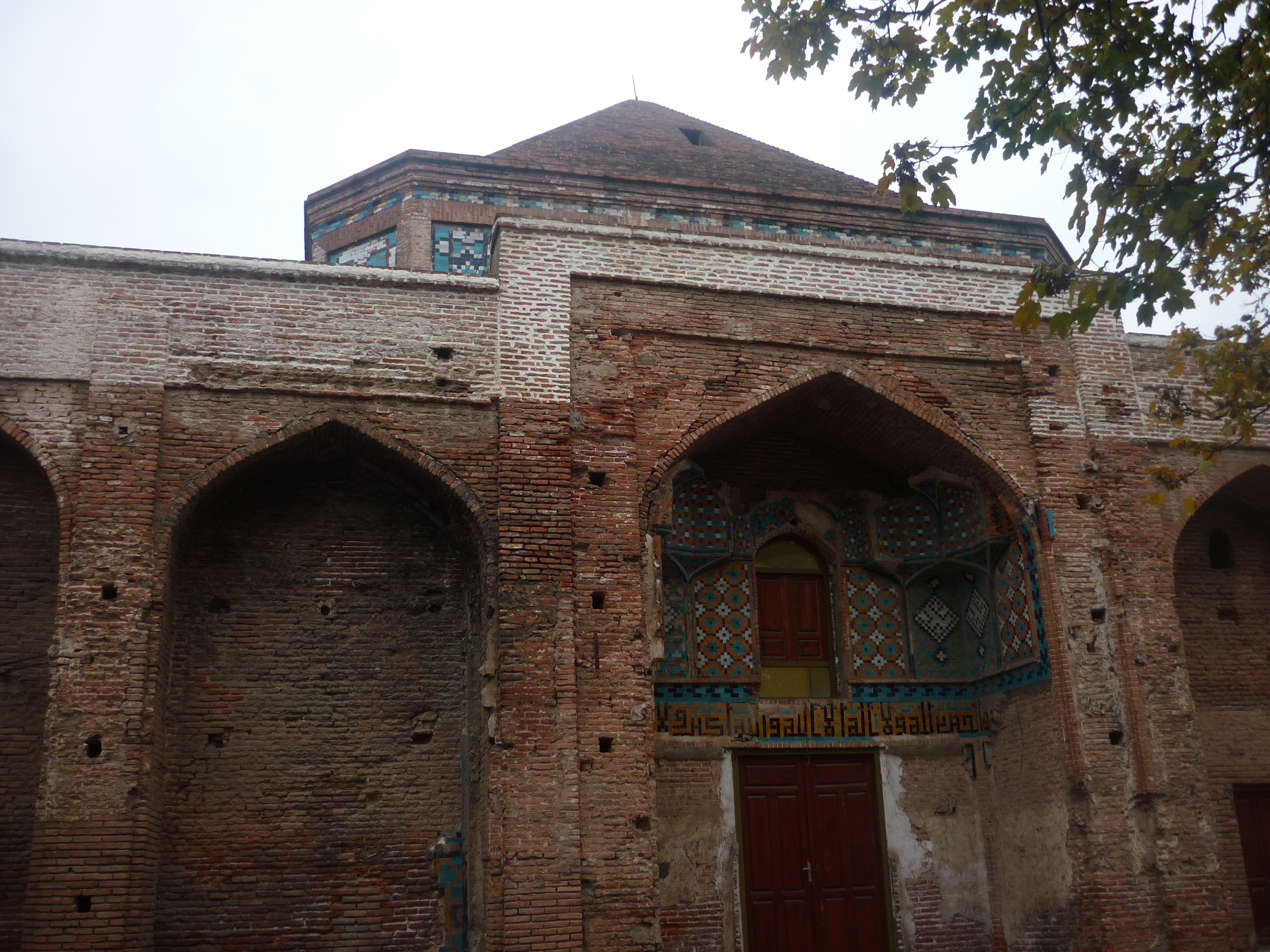
- Tomb of Mir-i Buzurg
- Reign: 1359–1362
- Predecessor: Kiya Afrasiyab (Afrasiyabids)
- Successor: Rida al-Din (Amol); Kamal al-Din I (Sari)
- Born: Unknown; Dabudasht
- Died: 1379; Mazandaran
- Burial: Amol
- House: Marashi
- Religion: Twelver Shi'a Islam

Qavam al-Din ibn Abdallah al-Marashi (Persian: قوام‌الدین بن عبدالله مرعشی), better known as Mir Buzurg or Mir Bozorg (Persian: میربزرگ, Mīr-e Bozorg, lit. "The great Mir"), was the founder of the Marashi dynasty, ruling from 1359 to 1362.

== Early life ==
Mir-i Buzurg belonged to a Sayyid family, he was the son of a certain Abdallah al-Marashi, who was the eponymous ancestor of the Marashi dynasty. Mir-i Buzurg, during his early life, lived in Dabudasht near Amol, which was then under Bavandid control. He studied religion and came into contact with Izz al-Din Sughandi, an influential sufi who was a pupil of Abd al-Razzaq ibn Fazlullah, the founder of the Sarbadars of Khorasan. Mir-i Buzurg later founded a Khanqah in Dabudasht and gained numerous followers. He also made a pilgrimage to the Imam Reza shrine in Mashhad.

In 1359, the Bavand dynasty was put to an end by the Chulabi nobleman Kiya Afrasiyab who founded the Afrasiyab dynasty. However, the nobles of Mazandaran did not acknowledge his rule and viewed it as usurpation. Afrasiyab shortly tried to achieve stability by asking aid from Mir-i Buzurg. However, some of Mir-i Buzurg's dervishes later acted hostile to Afrasiyab, which made him imprison Mir-i Buzurg and many of his dervishes. However, the supporters of Mir-i Buzurg shortly revolted, and freed him from prison. In 1359, a battle between Afrasiyab and Mir-i Buzurg took place near Amol, where Afrasiyab was defeated and was killed together with his three sons.

== Reign ==
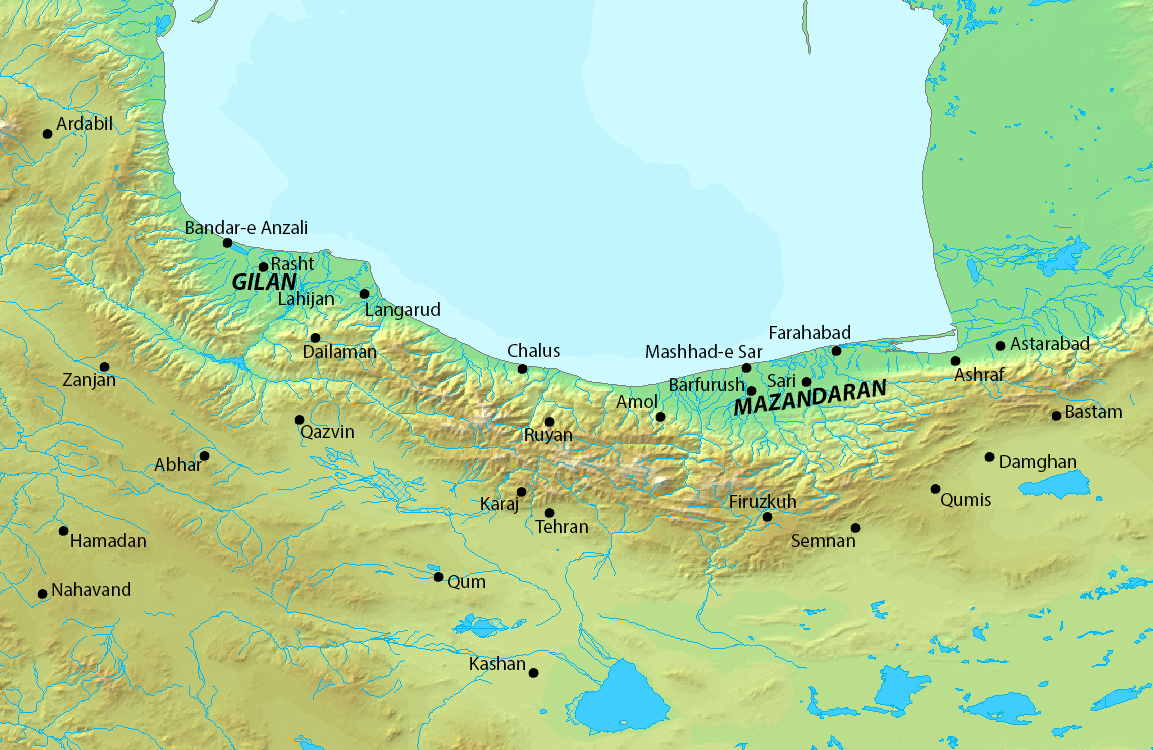
Map of northern Iran.

Mir-i Buzurg shortly conquered the territories of the Afrasiyab dynasty, and laid foundations to the Marashis. The following year Afrasiyab's son Fakhr al-Din Chulabi murdered one of the sons of Mir-i Buzurg, which resulted in a massacre of most of the Afrasiyabid family. Another son of Afrasiyab, Iskandar-i Shaykhi, managed to escape the massacre and flee to Khorasan.

Mir-i Buzurg then turned against Jalali family which governed Sari. A battle shortly ensured between Mir-i Buzurg and the two Jalali nobles Vishtasp Jalali and Fakhr al-Din Jalali, where Mir-i Buzurg was victorious. With the help of former loyalists of Kiya Afrasiyab, Vishtasp killed a son of Mir-i Buzurg. Fakhr al-Din Jalali and his four children were shortly killed in a battle by Mir-i Buzurg, who shortly entered Sari. Vishtasp then fled from Sari and took refuge with his family in a fortress. However, Mir-i Buzurg shortly besieged the fortress, and managed to capture it. He then had Vishtasp and his seven sons executed. A son of Mir-i Buzurg, Kamal al-Din I, then married the daughter of Vishtasp. Mir-i Buzurg also began rebuilding Sari which was greatly damaged during his invasion of the city.

All of Mazandaran was now united under the rule of Mir-i Buzurg, who wanted to spend the rest of his life in devoting himself to religion. In 1362 he gave his son Kamal al-Din I the city of Sari, while his other son Rida al-Din was given Amol. Mir-i Buzurg later died of illness in 1379, and was buried in Amol. In 1403, his tomb was destroyed by Iskandar-i Shaykhi, a son of Afrasiyab. However, after the death of Iskandar, the tomb of Mir-i Buzurg was rebuilt. During the reign of the Safavid Shah Abbas I, who was himself a descendant of Mir-i Buzurg from his mother's side, decorated his tomb with gold.

== Legacy ==
Mir-i Buzurg was famous for his charismatic behavior and tolerant rule. His descendants continued to rule in Mazandaran until it was annexed by the Safavid dynasty in 1596. Nevertheless, even after its fall, the Marashi family continued to play an important role in the politics of the Safavid dynasty, as it had before under Khayr al-Nisa Begum, who the mother of Shah Abbas I, and de facto ruler of the Safavid dynasty from February 1578 to July 1579.

== Sources ==
- Bosworth, C. E. (1984). "ĀL-E AFRĀSĪĀB". Encyclopaedia Iranica, Vol. I, Fasc. 7. London u.a.: Routledge & Kegan Paul. pp. 742–743. Archived from the original on 2014-02-20.
- Bosworth, C. E. (1989). "The Encyclopedia of Islam". The Encyclopaedia of Islam, Vol. 6, Fasc. 107-108. pp. 513–640. ISBN 9789004090828.
- Bosworth, C. E. (1986). "The Jalayirids, Muzaffarids and Sarbadars". In Frye, R. N. (ed.). The Cambridge History of Iran, Volume 6: The Timurid and Safavid periods. Cambridge: Cambridge University Press. pp. 1–42. ISBN 9780521200943.

Regnal titles
Preceded by Kiya Afrasiyab (Afrasiyabids)	Marashi ruler of Amol; 1359–1362	Succeeded by Rida al-Din
Preceded by Vishtasp Jalali	Marashi ruler of Sari; 1359–1362	Succeeded by Kamal al-Din I
