= Baduspanids =

Iranian dynasty (665–1598)

Baduspanids بادوسپانیان
- 665–1598
- The Baduspanids in 1346, during the reign of Jalal al-Dawla Iskandar (r. 1333–1360)
- Common languages: Persian; Caspian languages
- Religion: Zoroastrianism (665-9th-century); Islam (9th-century-1598)
- Government: Monarchy
- Ispahbadh Ustandar Malik
  - 665–694: Baduspan I (first)
  - 1590–1598: Jahangir IV (last)
- Historical era: Middle Ages
  - Established: 665
  - Safavid conquest: 1598
Preceded by	Succeeded by
Dabuyid dynasty	Safavid Iran
- Today part of: Iran

The Baduspanids, Paduspanids or Badusbanids (Persian: بادوسپانیان, romanized: Bâduspâniân), were a local Iranian dynasty of Tabaristan which ruled over Ruyan/Rustamdar. The dynasty was established in 665, and with 933 years of rule as the longest dynasty in Iran, it ended in 1598 when the Safavids invaded and conquered their domains.

== History ==
During the Arab invasion of Iran, the last Sasanian King of Kings (shahanshah) Yazdegerd III (r. 632–651) reportedly granted control over Tabaristan to the Dabuyid ruler Gil Gavbara, who was a great-grandson of shahanshah Jamasp (r. 496–498/9). Gil Gavbara's son Baduspan I was granted control over Ruyan in 665, thus forming the Baduspanid dynasty, which would rule the region until the 1590s. Another son, Dabuya succeeded their father the former as the head of the Dabuyid family, ruling the rest of Tabaristan.

The last Dabuyid ruler Khurshid managed to safeguard his realm against the Umayyad Caliphate, but after its replacement by the Abbasid Caliphate, he was finally defeated in 760. Tabaristan was subsequently made a regular province of the caliphate, ruled from Amul by an Arab governor, although the local dynasties of the Bavandids, Qarinvandids, the Zarmihrids and Baduspanids, formerly subject to the Dabuyids, continued to control the mountainous interior as tributary vassals of the Abbasid government. These rulers were largely if not completely autonomous. Due to the regional prominence of the Baduspanids, Ruyan became known as Rustamdar in the Mongol era, a deformed form of their regnal title, ustandar, which they had used since the rule of Shahriyar III ibn Jamshid (r. 937–949).

The Baduspanids were briefly deposed from power by the Mar'ashis, who ruled Rustamdar from 1381 till 1390, when they decided to install Baduspanid prince Sa'd al-Dawla Tus on the throne in Rustamdar to challenge the Afrasiyabid prince Iskandar-i Shaykhi who accompanied the Turco-Mongol ruler Timur (r. 1370–1405), who intended to conquer Mazandaran. However, Tus secretly corresponded with Iskandar-i Shaykhi, and eventually joined the forces of Timur in 1392. The following year (1393), Timur dislodged the Mar'ashis and conquered Mazandaran. In 1399/1400, he deprived the Baduspanids of most of their holdings by sending his troops to administer most of Rustamdar. The holdings of the new Baduspanid ruler Kayumarth I were now restricted to that of the castle of Nur. However, in 1405, he restored his rule in Rustamdar. He died in 1453. After his death, a dynastic struggle followed, which resulted in his kingdom being split up by his sons Iskandar IV and Ka'us II, in Kojur and Nur respectively. The Baduspanid dynasty was never to be united again, with the two branches ruling separately until they were eventually deposed in 1590s by the Safavid monarch of Iran, Abbas the Great (r. 1588–1629).

== Known Baduspanid rulers ==
- 665–694 : Baduspan I
- 694–723 : Khurzad ibn Baduspan
- 723–762 : Baduspan II
- 762–791 : Shahriyar I ibn Baduspan
- 791–822 : Vanda-Umid
- 822–855 : Abdallah ibn Vanda-Umid

=== Afridunid line ===
- 855–??? : Afridun ibn Karan
- ???–??? : Baduspan III
- ???–??? : Shahriyar II ibn Baduspan
- 887–899 : Hazar Sandan

=== Shahriyarid line ===
- 899–938 : Shahriyar III ibn Jamshid
- 938–965 : Muhammad
- 965–??? : Istwandad
- 974–1010 : Zarrin-Kamar I
- 1010–1036 : Ba-Harb
- 1036–1067 : Fakhr al-Dawla Namavar I
- 1067–1092 : Ardashir
- 1092–1132: Hazarasp I
- 1117–1168 : Shahrivash
- 1168–1184 : Kai Ka'us I
- 1184–1190 : Hazarasp II
- 1190–1209 : Bavandid occupation
- 1209–1213 : Zarrin-Kamar II
- 1213–1223 : Bisutun I
- 1223–1242/1243 : Fakhr al-Dawla Namavar II
- Died in 1242 : Hosam al-Dawla Ardashir
- 1242–???? : Iskandar I
- 1242–1272 : Shahragim
- 1272–1301 : Namawar Shah Ghazi
- 1301–1311 : Kay Khusraw
- 1311–1317 : Shams al-Muluk Muhammad
- 1317–1324 : Nasir al-Din Shahriyar
- 1324–1333 : Taj al-Dawla Ziyar
- 1333–1359 : Jalal al-Dawla Iskandar
- 1359–1378 : Fakhr al-Dawla Shah-Ghazi
- 1378–1379 : Adud al-Dawla Qubad
- 1379–1391 : Mar'ashi occupation
- 1391–1394 : Sa'd al-Dawla Tus
- 1399–1453 : Kayumarth I

=== Nur branch ===
- 1453–1467 : Ka'us II
- 1467–1499 : Jahangir I
- 1499–1507 : Bisutun II
- 1507–1550 : Bahman of Tabaristan
- 1550–1576 : Kayumarth IV
- 1582–1586 : Sultan Aziz
- 1586–1593/1594 : Jahangir III

=== Kojur branch ===
- 1453–1476 : Iskandar IV
- 1476–1491 : Taj-al-Dawla ibn Iskandar
- 1491–1507 : Ashraf ibn Taj al-Dawla
- 1507–1543 : Ka'us III
- 1543–1555 : Kayumarth III
- 1555–1567 : Jahangir II
- 1568–1590 : Sultan Mohammad ibn Jahangir
- 1590–1598 : Jahangir IV

== See also ==
- Dabuyid dynasty
- Bavand dynasty
- House of Ispahbudhan

== Sources ==
- Bosworth, C.E. (1978). "Ḳāwūs". In van Donzel, E.; Lewis, B.; Pellat, Ch. & Bosworth, C. E. (eds.). The Encyclopaedia of Islam, Second Edition. Volume IV: Iran–Kha. Leiden: E. J. Brill. ISBN 978-90-04-05745-6. OCLC 758278456.
- Bosworth, C. E. (1968). "The Political and Dynastic History of the Iranian World (A.D. 1000–1217)". In Boyle, John Andrew (ed.). The Cambridge History of Iran: The Saljuq and Mongol Periods. Vol. 5. Cambridge: Cambridge University Press. ISBN 0-521-06936-X.
- Bosworth, C. E. (1984). "Āl-e Afrāsīāb". Encyclopædia Iranica, online edition, Vol. I, Fasc. 7. New York. pp. 742–743.
- Calmard, J (1991). "Marʿas̲h̲is". In Bosworth, C. E.; van Donzel, E. & Pellat, Ch. (eds.). The Encyclopaedia of Islam, Second Edition. Volume VI: Mahk–Mid. Leiden: E. J. Brill. ISBN 978-90-04-08112-3.
- Ghereghlou, Kioumars (2018). "Bādūsbānids". In Fleet, Kate; Krämer, Gudrun; Matringe, Denis; Nawas, John; Rowson, Everett (eds.). Encyclopaedia of Islam (3rd ed.). Brill Online. ISSN 1873-9830.
- Madelung, W. (1975). "The Minor Dynasties of Northern Iran". In Frye, Richard N. (ed.). The Cambridge History of Iran: From the Arab Invasion to the Saljuqs. Vol. 4. Cambridge: Cambridge University Press. pp. 198–249. ISBN 0-521-20093-8.
- Madelung, Wilferd (1988). "Baduspanids". Encyclopædia Iranica, online edition, Vol. III, Fasc. 4. New York. pp. 385–391.
- Madelung, Wilfred (1993). "Dabuyids". Encyclopædia Iranica, Vol. VI, online edition, Fasc. 5. New York. pp. 541–544.
- Malek, Hodge Mehdi (2017). "Tabaristān During the 'Abbāsid Period: The Overlapping Coinage of the Governors and Other Officials (144-178H)". In Faghfoury, Mostafa (ed.). Iranian Numismatic Studies. A Volume in Honor of Stephen Album. Lancaster and London: Classical Numismatic Group. pp. 101–126.
- Manz, Beatrice Forbes (2007). Power, Politics and Religion in Timurid Iran. Cambridge University Press. ISBN 978-1-139-46284-6.
- Melville, Charles (2020). The Timurid Century: The Idea of Iran Vol.9. University of Cambridge, English: Bloomsbury Publishing. ISBN 9781838606152.
- Minorsky, Vladimir (1995). "Rūyān". In Bosworth, C. E.; van Donzel, E.; Heinrichs, W. P. & Lecomte, G. (eds.). The Encyclopaedia of Islam, Second Edition. Volume VIII: Ned–Sam. Leiden: E. J. Brill. ISBN 978-90-04-09834-3.
- Rekaya, M. (1986). "Khurshīd". In Bosworth, C. E.; van Donzel, E.; Lewis, B. & Pellat, Ch. (eds.). The Encyclopaedia of Islam, Second Edition. Volume V: Khe–Mahi. Leiden: E. J. Brill. pp. 68–70. ISBN 978-90-04-07819-2.
- Yavari, Neguin (2015). "Afrāsiyābids". In Fleet, Kate; Krämer, Gudrun; Matringe, Denis; Nawas, John; Rowson, Everett (eds.). Encyclopaedia of Islam (3rd ed.). Brill Online. ISSN 1873-9830.
- Yavari, Neguin (2020). "Dābūyids". In Fleet, Kate; Krämer, Gudrun; Matringe, Denis; Nawas, John; Rowson, Everett (eds.). Encyclopaedia of Islam (3rd ed.). Brill Online. ISSN 1873-9830.
