= Dabudasht =

City in Mazandaran province, Iran

Dabudasht Persian: دابودشت
- City
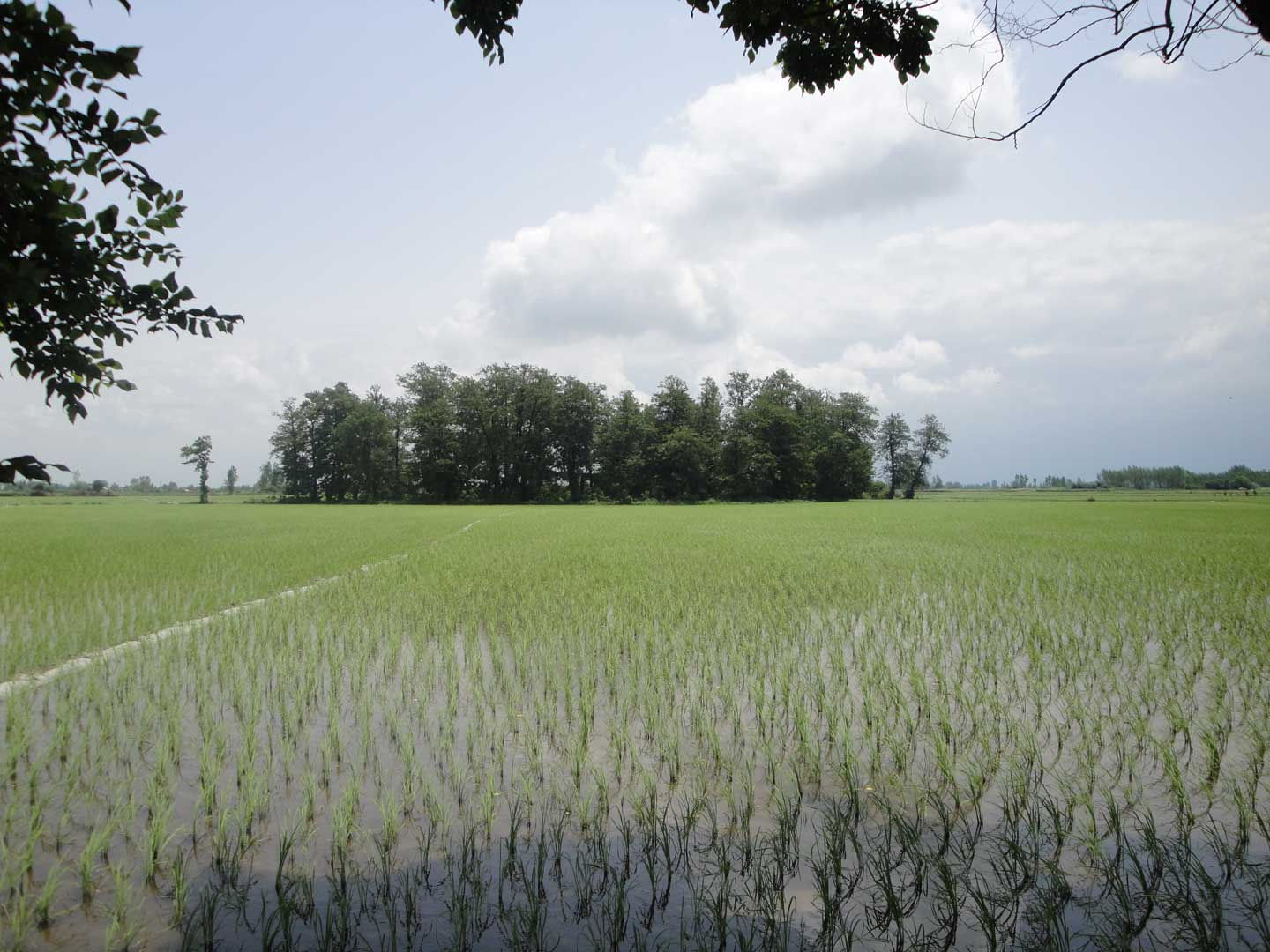
- Rice paddy near the city of Dabudasht

- Location within Iran
- Coordinates: 36°28′47″N 52°27′03″E
- Country: Iran
- Province: Mazandaran
- County: Amol
- District: Dabudasht
- Established as a city: 2005

Population (2016)
  - Total: 1,758
- Time zone: UTC+3:30 (IRST)

Dabudasht (Persian: دابودشت) (Note: Formerly Darvish Kheyl (درويش خيل), also romanized as Darvīsh Kheyl) is a city in, and the capital of, Dabudasht District in Amol County, Mazandaran province, Iran. The village of Darvish Kheyl merged with several villages and was converted to a city in 2005.

== Demographics ==
=== Population ===
At the time of the 2006 National Census, the city's population was 1,096 in 300 households. The following census in 2011 counted 1,169 people in 358 households. The 2016 census measured the population of the city as 1,758 people in 572 households.

== Agriculture ==
Its main products are rice, various citrus fruits, vegetables, and fruits such as apples, pears, and figs. Amol is the rice capital of Iran, with the center in Dabudasht District, where the National Rice Festival is held every year.

== See also ==
- Dabuyids
