= Ruyan (district) =

Historical area of Iran

Map of northern Iran during the Iranian Intermezzo. The borders represent the traditional geographical boundaries of each region

Ruyan (Persian: رویان), later known as Rustamdar (رستمدار), was a mountainous district that encompassed the western part of Tabaristan/Mazandaran, a region on the Caspian coast of northern Iran. (Note: Tabaristan was the predominant name of the region until the 11th-century, when it was replaced by Mazandaran.)

In Iranian mythology, Ruyan appears as one of the places that the legendary archer Arash shot his arrow from, reaching the edge of Khorasan to mark the border between Iran and Turan. The region first appears in historical records as one of the lands of king Gushnasp and his descendants, who served as Sasanian vassals, until they were deposed by the King of Kings (shahanshah) Kavad I (r. 488–496, 498–531).

During the Arab invasion of Iran, the last shahanshah Yazdegerd III (r. 632–651) reportedly granted control over Tabaristan to the Dabuyid ruler Gil Gavbara, who was a great-grandson of shahanshah Jamasp (r. 496–498/9). Gil Gavbara's son Baduspan I was granted control over Ruyan in 665, thus forming the Baduspanid dynasty, which would rule the area until its conquest by the Safavids in the 1590s.

== History ==
Ruyan was the name of a mountainous district that encompassed the western part of Tabaristan/Mazandaran, a region on the Caspian coast of northern Iran. The French orientalist James Darmesteter suggested that Ruyan was identical to the mountain called Raodita ("reddish") in the Zoroastrian document Yasht and Royishnomand in another Zoroastrian document, the Bundahishn. According to the medieval Iranian scholar al-Biruni (d. after 1050), it was from Ruyan that the legendary archer Arash shot his arrow to the edge of Khorasan to mark the border between Iran and Turan.

Ruyan is included among the lands of a local king named Gushnasp according to the Letter of Tansar, which was written by the high priest of the Sasanian King of Kings (shahanshah) Ardashir I (r. 224–242). Gushnasp submitted to Ardashir I after being guaranteed to keep his kingdom. His line would continue ruling Tabaristan until the second reign of Kavad I (r. 488–496, 498–531), who removed the dynasty from power and appointed his son Kawus in its stead. During the Arab invasion of Iran, the last shahanshah Yazdegerd III (r. 632–651) reportedly granted control over Tabaristan to the Dabuyid ruler Gil Gavbara, who was a great-grandson of shahanshah Jamasp (r. 496–498/9). Gil Gavbara's son Baduspan I was granted control over Ruyan in 665, thus forming the Baduspanid dynasty, which would rule the region until the 1590s. Another son, Dabuya succeeded their father the former as the head of the Dabuyid family, ruling the rest of Tabaristan.

The last Dabuyid ruler Khurshid managed to safeguard his realm against the Umayyad Caliphate, but he was finally defeated in 760 by its successor, the Abbasid Caliphate. Tabaristan was subsequently made a regular province of the caliphate, ruled from Amul by an Arab governor, although the local dynasties of the Bavandids, Qarinvandids, the Zarmihrids and Baduspanids, formerly subject to the Dabuyids, continued to control the mountainous interior as tributary vassals of the Abbasid government. These rulers were largely if not completely autonomous.

According to the 10th-century Persian geographers Ahmad ibn Rustah and Ibn al-Faqih, Ruyan was initially a district of Daylam, but was added to Tabaristan after its conquest by the caliphate. Ruyan was a large district surrounded by two mountains on each side. Each town was able to raise 400–1000 men-in-arms. The kharaj (tax) imposed by the caliph Harun al-Rashid (r. 786–809) was 400,050 dirhams. A wali was stationed there, in the town of Kajija. The reports of the two authors seemingly indicate that there was a frontier zone between Ruyan and independent Daylam, which included the towns of Chalus, al-Muhdatha, and Muzn. Due to the regional prominence of the Baduspanids, Ruyan became known as Rustamdar in the Mongol era, a deformed form of their regnal title, ustandar, which they had used since the rule of Shahriyar III ibn Jamshid (r. 937–949).

The Baduspanids were briefly deposed from power by the Mar'ashis, who ruled Rustamdar from 1381 until 1390, when they decided to install Baduspanid prince Sa'd al-Dawla Tus on the throne in Rustamdar to challenge the Afrasiyabid prince Iskandar-i Shaykhi who accompanied the Turco-Mongol ruler Timur (r. 1370–1405), who intended to conquer Mazandaran. However, Tus secretly corresponded with Iskandar-i Shaykhi, and eventually joined the forces of Timur in 1392. The following year (1393), Timur dislodged the Mar'ashis and conquered Mazandaran. In 1399/1400, he deprived the Baduspanids of most of their holdings by sending his troops to administer most of Rustamdar. The holdings of the new Baduspanid ruler Kayumarth I were now restricted to that of the castle of Nur. However, in 1405, he restored his rule in Rustamdar. He died in 1453. After his death, a dynastic struggle followed, which resulted in his kingdom being split up by his sons Iskandar IV and Ka'us II, in Kojur and Nur respectively. The Baduspanid dynasty was never to be united again, with the two branches ruling separately until they were eventually deposed in 1590s by the Safavid monarch of Iran, Abbas the Great (r. 1588–1629).

== Sources ==
- Bosworth, C. E. (1968). "The Political and Dynastic History of the Iranian World (A.D. 1000–1217)". In Boyle, John Andrew (ed.). The Cambridge History of Iran. Vol. 5. Cambridge: Cambridge University Press. ISBN 0-521-06936-X.
- Bosworth, C.E. (1978). "Ḳāwūs". In van Donzel, E.; Lewis, B.; Pellat, Ch. & Bosworth, C. E. (eds.). The Encyclopaedia of Islam, Second Edition. Volume IV: Iran–Kha. Leiden: E. J. Brill. OCLC 758278456.
- Bosworth, C. E. (1984). "Āl-e Afrāsīāb". Encyclopædia Iranica, online edition, Vol. I, Fasc. 7. New York. pp. 742–743.
- Blois, F. C. de (2000). "Tansar". In Bearman, P. J.; Bianquis, Th.; Bosworth, C. E.; van Donzel, E. & Heinrichs, W. P. (eds.). The Encyclopaedia of Islam, Second Edition. Volume X: T–U. Leiden: E. J. Brill. ISBN 978-90-04-11211-7.
- Brunner, Christopher (1968). "Geographical and Administrative divisions: Settlements and Economy". In Fischer, William B. (ed.). The Cambridge History of Iran. Vol. 3b. Cambridge: Cambridge University Press. pp. 747–778. ISBN 0-521-06935-1.
- Felix, Wolfgang; Madelung, Wilferd (1995). "Deylamites". Encyclopaedia Iranica, Vol. VII, online edition, Fasc. 4. New York. pp. 342–347.
- Gazerani, Saghi (2014). "Why Was the Story of Arash-i Kamangir Excluded from the Shahnameh". Iran Nameh: 42–63.
- Ghereghlou, Kioumars (2018). "Bādūsbānids". In Fleet, Kate; Krämer, Gudrun; Matringe, Denis; Nawas, John; Rowson, Everett (eds.). Encyclopaedia of Islam (3rd ed.). Brill Online. ISSN 1873-9830.
- Madelung, W. (1975). "The Minor Dynasties of Northern Iran". In Frye, Richard N. (ed.). The Cambridge History of Iran. Vol. 4. Cambridge: Cambridge University Press. pp. 198–249. ISBN 0-521-20093-8.
- Madelung, Wilferd (1988). "Baduspanids". Encyclopædia Iranica, online edition, Vol. III, Fasc. 4. New York. pp. 385–391.
- Madelung, Wilfred (1993). "Dabuyids". Encyclopædia Iranica, Vol. VI, online edition, Fasc. 5. New York. pp. 541–544.
- Malek, Hodge Mehdi (2017). "Tabaristān During the 'Abbāsid Period: The Overlapping Coinage of the Governors and Other Officials (144-178H)". In Faghfoury, Mostafa (ed.). Iranian Numismatic Studies. A Volume in Honor of Stephen Album. Lancaster and London: Classical Numismatic Group. pp. 101–126.
- Melville, Charles (2020). The Timurid Century: The Idea of Iran Vol.9. University of Cambridge, English: Bloomsbury Publishing. ISBN 9781838606152.
- Minorsky, Vladimir (1995). "Rūyān". In Bosworth, C. E.; van Donzel, E.; Heinrichs, W. P. & Lecomte, G. (eds.). The Encyclopaedia of Islam, Second Edition. Volume VIII: Ned–Sam. Leiden: E. J. Brill. ISBN 978-90-04-09834-3.
- Rekaya, M. (1986). "Khurshīd". In Bosworth, C. E.; van Donzel, E.; Lewis, B. & Pellat, Ch. (eds.). The Encyclopaedia of Islam, Second Edition. Volume V: Khe–Mahi. Leiden: E. J. Brill. pp. 68–70. ISBN 978-90-04-07819-2.
- Webb, Peter (2018). "Tabarestan". In Nicholson, Oliver (ed.). The Oxford Dictionary of Late Antiquity. Oxford: Oxford University Press. ISBN 978-0-19-866277-8.
- Yavari, Neguin (2020). "Dābūyids". In Fleet, Kate; Krämer, Gudrun; Matringe, Denis; Nawas, John; Rowson, Everett (eds.). Encyclopaedia of Islam (3rd ed.). Brill Online. ISSN 1873-9830.
