= Afrasiyab dynasty =

State in present-day northern Iran from 1349 to 1504

Afrasiyab dynasty چلاویان
- 1349–1504
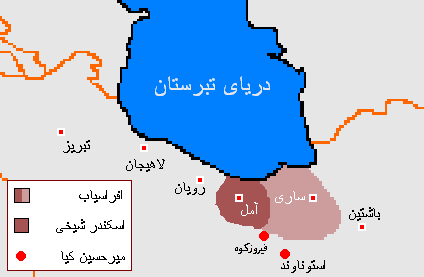
- Capital: Amol (1349–1359 & 1393-1403); Firuzkuh (?) (1403–1504)
- Common languages: Mazandarani
- Religion: Shia Islam
- Government: Monarchy
  - 1349–1359: Kiya Afrasiyab (first)
  - ?–1504: Kiya Husayn II (last)
- Historical era: Middle Ages
  - Established: 1349
  - Safavid conquest: 1504
Preceded by	Succeeded by
Bavand dynasty	Marashis; Safavid Iran

The Afrasiyab or Chalavi dynasty was a relatively minor Iranian Shia dynasty of Tabaristan (present-day Mazandaran province, Iran) and flourished in the late medieval, pre-Safavid period; it is also called the Kia dynasty. It was founded by Kiya Afrasiyab, who conquered the Bavand kingdom in 1349 and made himself king of the region. In 1504, Ismail I invaded Mazandaran and ended Afrasiyab rule of the region.

== History ==
Kiya Afrasiyab was the son of certain Hasan Chulabi, who belonged to the Chulabids, a prominent family of Mazandaran which served the Bavandids. Afrasiyab was the sipahsalar and the brother-in-law of the Bavandid ruler Hasan II (r. 1334–1349).

In 1349, the Bavandid ruler Hasan ordered the execution of one of his most powerful officials, Jalal ibn Ahmad Jal, who was from the powerful Jalali which governed Sari. The execution resulted in a revolt by the nobles of Mazandaran. Hasan then tried to get support from the Chulabids. However, the two sons of Afrasiyab, murdered Hasan while the latter was in a bath.

Afrasiyab then gained control of the Bavandid territories, thus marking the end of the Bavand dynasty and the start of the Afrasiyab dynasty. A son of Hasan managed to flee to the court of the Paduspanid ruler Eskandar II, who later tried to restore Bavand rule in Mazandaran, but failed to do so. Afrasiyab also faced another problem; the nobles of Mazandaran did not acknowledge his rule and viewed it as usurpation.

Afrasiyab shortly tried to achieve stability by asking aid from Mir-i Buzurg, a Sayyid dervish from Dabudasht. However, some of Mir-i Buzurg's dervishes acted hostile to Afrasiyab, which made him imprison Mir-i Buzurg and many of his dervishes. However, the supporters of Mir-i Buzurg shortly revolted, and freed him from prison. In 1359, a battle between Afrasiyab and Mir-i Buzurg took place near Amol, where Afrasiyab was defeated and was killed together with his three sons.

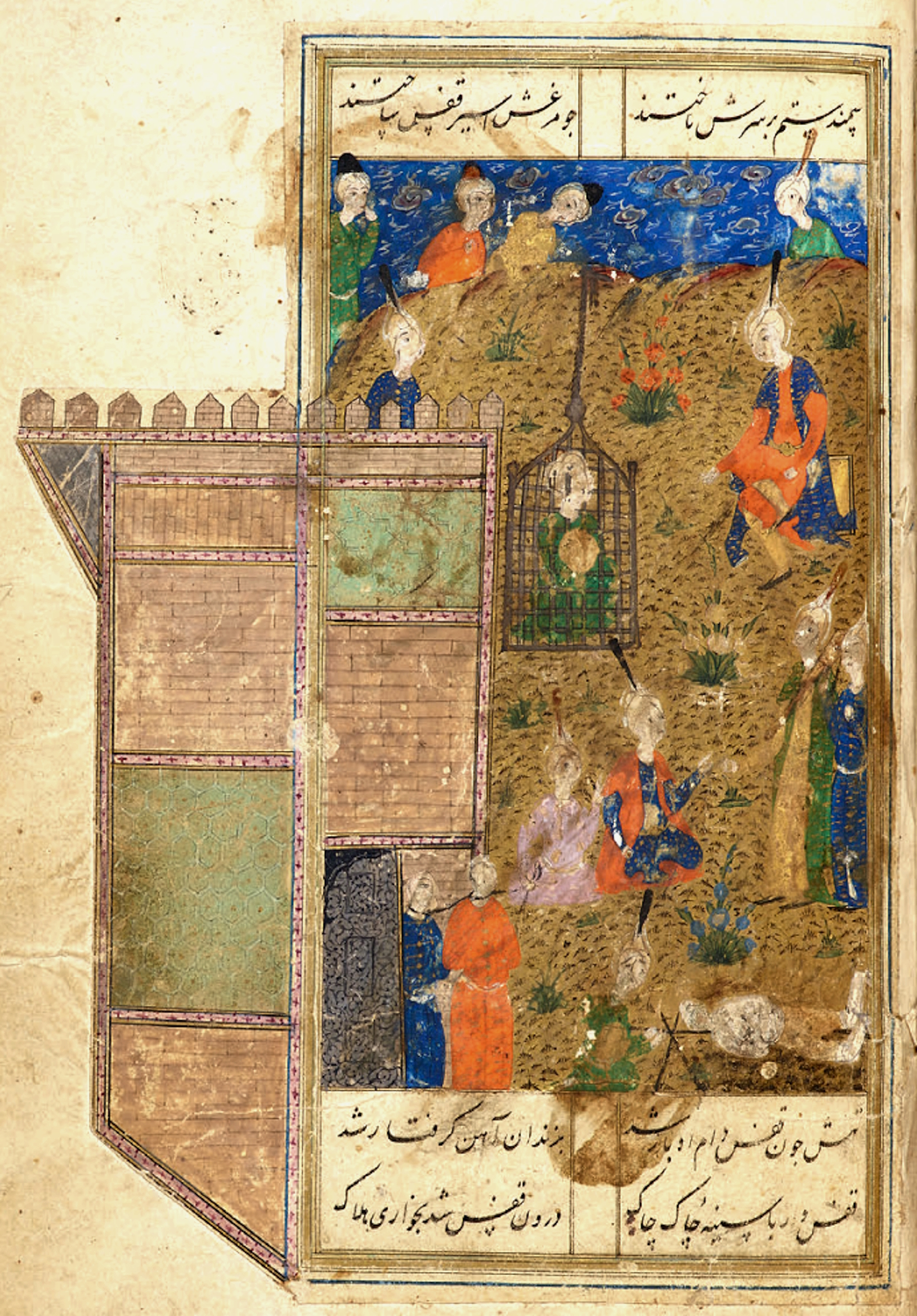
Husayn Kiya Chulavi in a cage, while the body of Murad Beg Jahanshahlu, an Aq Qoyunlu general, roasts on a spit in 1504 at the hand of the Safavids. Shahnama-yi i Ismaʻil, MS. Elliot 328, Bodleian Library, Oxford, fol. 91a.

Mir-i Buzurg shortly conquered the territories of the Afrasiyab dynasty, and laid foundations to the Marashi dynasty. Afrasiyab had several other sons who tried to restore Afrasiyabid authority in Mazandaran. His son Fakhr al-Din Chulabi murdered one of the sons of Mir-i Buzurg, which resulted in a massacre of most of the Afrasiyabid family. Afrasiyab's other son Iskandar-i Shaykhi, managed with the aid of Timur, to restore Afrasiyabid authority in 1393. Iskandar later aided Timur in his campaign to Iraq, Shirvan and Anatolia. After having achieved great success during the campaign, Iskandar was allowed to return to Mazandaran, but shortly rebelled against Timur. In 1403, Timur invaded Mazandaran to repress the rebellion. Iskandar, together with his wife and two children, then fled from Amol. Iskandar, fearing that they might betray him, killed them.

Iskandar was shortly killed by the army of Timur, who under the orders of Timur, had Iskandar's head sent to his son Kiya Husayn I, who had fortified himself in Firuzkuh. Kiya Husayn I, after having seen the head of his father, agreed to surrender to Timur, and was pardoned by the latter, who acknowledged him as the ruler of the Afrasiyab dynasty. Kiya Husayn was later succeeded by his son Luhrasp, who ruled sometime around 1475. His grandson, Kiya Husayn II, ruled over a large part of western Mazandaran, and districts of Firuzkuh, Damavand, and Hari-rud. During the dissolution of the Aq Qoyunlu confederation, Kiya Husayn II expanded his rule from western into central Iran, where he captured Ray and Semman. He also defeated Mohammad Hosayn Mirza, who was the Timurid governor of Astarabad.

He later became the enemy of the Safavid Shah Ismail I (r. 1501–1524), whom he may have seen as a rival for the command over the Shi'ites in Iran. In 1504, Kiya Husayn II's territories was invaded by Ismail I, who seized the strongholds of Gol-e Khan and Firuzkuh, and surrounded Kiya Husayn II in Osta, who was shortly captured. However, the latter committed suicide—his body was burned at Isfahan in front its inhabitants, whilst his followers in Mazandaran were slaughtered.

== Sources ==
- Madelung, W. (1984). "Āl-E Bǎvand (Bavandids)". Encyclopaedia Iranica, vol. I, fasc. 7. London u.a.: Routledge & Kegan Paul. pp. 747–753. ISBN 90-04-08114-3.
- Bosworth, C. E. (1984). "Āl-e Afrāsīāb". Encyclopædia Iranica, online edition, Vol. I, Fasc. 7. New York. pp. 742–743.
- Savory, Roger (1998). "EsmāʿĪl I Ṣafawī". Encyclopaedia Iranica, Vol. VIII, Fasc. 6. pp. 628–636.
