= Ostandar =

Administrative title in the Sasanian Empire

Ostandar or Ustandar was an administrative title wielded by provincial governors under the Sasanian Empire. They governed the royal lands, known as the ostan. The title was later assumed by the Baduspanids of Ruyan, starting with Shahriyar III ibn Jamshid (r. 937–949).

== Sources ==
- Daryaee, Touraj (2014). Sasanian Persia: The Rise and Fall of an Empire. I.B.Tauris. pp. 1–240. ISBN 978-0857716668.
- Ghereghlou, Kioumars (2018). "Bādūsbānids". In Fleet, Kate; Krämer, Gudrun; Matringe, Denis; Nawas, John; Rowson, Everett (eds.). Encyclopaedia of Islam (3rd ed.). Brill Online. ISSN 1873-9830.
- Madelung, Wilferd (1988). "Baduspanids". Encyclopædia Iranica, online edition, Vol. III, Fasc. 4. New York. pp. 385–391.
- Miri, Negin (2012). "Sasanian Pars: Historical Geography and Administrative Organization". Sasanika: 1–183.
