= Mar'ashis =

Iranian Sayyid Twelver Shiʿite dynasty ruling in Mazandaran (1359-1596)

Mar'ashi dynasty مرعشیون
- 1359–1596
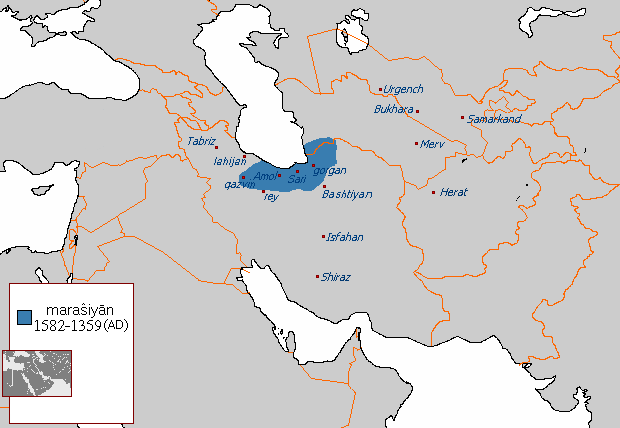
- Map of the Mar'ashi state
- Capital: Amol, Sari, Vatashan
- Common languages: Mazanderani
- Religion: Twelver Shia Islam
- Government: Monarchy
  - 1359-1362: Mir-i Buzurg (first)
  - 1362-1392: Rida al-Din
  - 1362-1392: Kamal al-Din I
  - 1404-?: Ghiyas al-Din Ali
- Historical era: Middle Ages
  - Established: 1359
  - Disestablished: 1596
Preceded by	Succeeded by
Afrasiyab dynasty	Safavid Empire
- Today part of: Iran

The Mar'ashis (Mazandarani: مرعشیون; Persian: مرعشیان Mar'ašiyān) or the Mar'ashi dynasty were an Iranian Sayyid Twelver Shiʿite dynasty of Mazandarani origin, ruling in Mazandaran from 1359 to 1596.

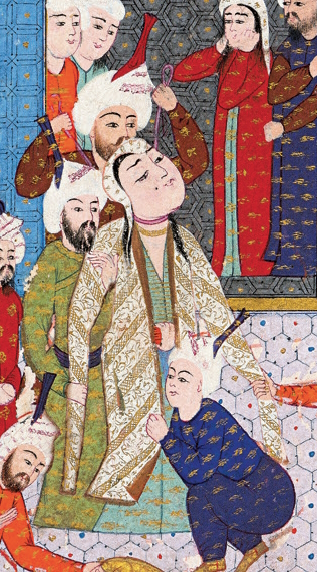
The strangulation of the Mar'ashi Safavid queen Khayr al-Nisa Begum by the Qizilbash, at the Safavid court on 26 July 1579. Nusretname (Topkapi, H.1365) (1584).

The dynasty was founded by Mir-i Buzurg, a Sayyid native to Dabudasht. Their capitals were Amol, Sari, and Vatashan.

== Sources ==
- Bosworth, C. E. (1984). "Āl-e Afrāsīāb". Encyclopædia Iranica, online edition, Vol. I, Fasc. 7. New York. pp. 742–743.
- Bosworth, C. E. (1986). "The Jalayirids, Muzaffarids and Sarbadars". In Frye, R. N. (ed.). The Cambridge History of Iran, Volume 6: The Timurid and Safavid periods. Cambridge: Cambridge University Press. pp. 1–42. ISBN 9780521200943.
- Calmard, J (1991). "Marʿas̲h̲is". In Bosworth, C. E.; van Donzel, E. & Pellat, Ch. (eds.). The Encyclopaedia of Islam, Second Edition. Volume VI: Mahk–Mid. Leiden: E. J. Brill. ISBN 978-90-04-08112-3.
- Manz, Beatrice Forbes (2007). Power, Politics and Religion in Timurid Iran. Cambridge University Press. ISBN 978-1-139-46284-6.
- Subtelny, Maria (2007). Timurids in Transition: Turko-Persian Politics and Acculturation in Medieval Iran. Brill. ISBN 978-90-04-16031-6.
- Uluç, Lâle (2013). "The representation of the execution of the Safavid Begum from the Ottoman Historian Mustafa Ali's Nusretname". 14th International Congress of Turkish Art Proceedings (PDF). Paris: Collège de France. pp. 799–820. ISBN 978-9751736970.
