= Tabaristan uprising =

Zoroastrian rebellion (781–805)

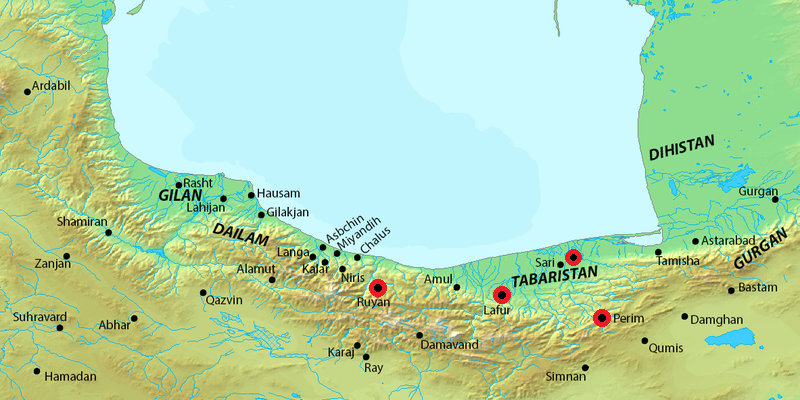
- Centers of rebellion against the caliph in Tabaristan, from right to left: Parim, Miandorud, Lafur and Kelār
Date	781–805 CE
Location	From Gilan to Tammisha (Tabarestan)
Result	Abbasid victory
Territorial changes	Abbasid authority reestablished over Tabaristan

Belligerents
Karenids; Bavandids; Zarmihrids	Abbasid Caliphate

Commanders and leaders
Wandad Hurmuzd (WIA); Sharwin I Masmughans of Damavand	Abdul Hamid Madhroub †; Salim al-Farghani †; Farasha † al-Hadi; Yazid al-Shaybani; Sa'id al-Harishi; Harun al-Rashid

Tabaristan uprising (Persian: شورش طبرستان; Arabic: اِنْتِفَاضَةُ طَبَرِسْتَانَ ; 781–805) was a series of rebellions by the indigenous Zoroastrian population of Tabaristan against the Abbasid Caliphate, led by local Spahbeds which occurred between 781 and 805. A few years after Spahbed Khurshid's suicide and the annihilation of the Dabuyid dynasty, as dissatisfaction with the actions of the Abbasid caliphs grew, people turned to the Qarinvand dynasty Spahbed, Wandad Hurmuzd and asked him to lead their uprising. After deliberation with Spahbeds of other dynasties, such as the Bavandids, he accepted the people's request. However, the uprisings were ultimately suppressed by Abbasid forces by 805.

== Background ==
After the Muslim conquest of Persia, most of Iran's territories fell under Muslim hands. The Muslim conquerors discriminated and harassed Zoroastrians and forced them to pay Jizya. Among the former Sasanian territories, the southern coast of the Caspian Sea sternly stood against Arabs and the influence of Islam. These areas were sheltered by the high mountains of Alborz, against the attack of the large army of Arabs while advancing towards Khorasan. At that time, Tabaristan was the most advanced and populated of the regions south of the Caspian Sea, and was ruled by a dynasty of House of Ispahbudhan called the Dabuyids and Tabaristan was subsequently made a regular province of the caliphate, ruled from Amul by an Arab governor, although the local dynasties of the Bavandids, Qarinvandids, the Zarmihrids and Baduspanids, formerly subject to the Dabuyids, continued to control the mountainous interior as tributary vassals of the Abbasid government.

Caliph Al-Mansur sent his son and heir, al-Mahdi (r. 775–785), to recover the treasure of Abu Muslim. Khurshid denied having it, and al-Mansur tried to unseat Khurshid by crowning one of his cousins as ispahbadh. This did not have the desired effect of challenging the loyalty of Khurshid's subjects, but Khurshid was eventually forced to accommodate the Abbasids by accepting an increase in the annual tribute, which brought it to the level paid to the Sassanids. Al-Mansur sent his generals Abu al-Khaṣīb Marzuq and Khazim bin Khuzaymah into Tabaristan, with the intention of completely subduing the country and making it a province. Khurshid fled to the fortress of al-Tak in the mountains, where he was besieged in 759–760. Although Khurshid himself escaped to nearby Daylam, the fortress eventually fell, and with it his family fell into the hands of the Abbasids and brought to Baghdad.

From Daylam, Khurshid tried to regain his kingdom. He raised an army from the mountain dwellers of the region, and tried to invade Tabaristan in 760. Repulsed, he returned to Daylam. After learning of his family's capture, took poison, probably in 761.

Tabaristan became a regular province of the Caliphate, ruled from Amul by an Arab governor, although the local dynasties of the Bavandids, Karinids and Zarmihrids, formerly subject to the Dabuyids, continued to control the mountainous interior as tributary vassals of the Abbasid government. Abu al-Khaṣīb Marzuq was the first Abbasid governor of Tabaristan, who constructed a great mosque in Sari.

== Rebellion ==
=== First phase of the rebellion (781–785) ===
During the reign of Caliph Al-Mahdi, the inhabitants of Tabaristan rebelled under the leadership of Prince Wandad Hurmuzd (r. 765–809) in 164 AH / 780-781 CE as a result of the arbitrary financial policies of the Abbasid governor of Tabaristan Abd al-Hamid Madhrub. It is known that Wandad Hurmuzd accepted leadership of the revolt after securing the cooperation of other local princes such as the Spahbed Sharwin I (r. 772–817) and Masmughans of Damavand.

The second governor, Khalid ibn Barmak, had attempted to build towns and befriend the Qarinvand ruler Wandad Hurmuzd in order to increase Abbasid influence there. After he left the region, however, during the rebellion, the Bavandid ruler Sharwin I destroyed his constructions.

It was said that a large number of Arabs were killed in a great massacre, although this massacre was considered to be an exaggeration. Ibn Isfandiyar confirms that Iranian women who had married Arab Muslims were also killed. Governor Abd al-Hamid Madhrub was among the victims.

In 164–166 AH / 780–782 CE, the rebellion continued and the war between Wandad Hurmuzd and the Abbasid army went back and forth. The Abbasids were defeated by the rebels and their commander Salm al-Farghani was killed on the battlefield. The reinforcements that came to them under the leadership of Farasha, one of the Caliph's mawla and a commander, was also defeated and killed.

It appears that most Abbasid governors of Tabaristan used a policy of force that did not succeed but instead led to a new movement in 167 AH / 783-784 CE. Caliph al-Hadi sent his heir apparent Musa (al-Hadi) and Yazid ibn Mazyad al-Shaybani. In 168/784–785, the new army was reinforced by Sa'id al-Harishi with 40,000 soldiers. Yazid al-Shaybani defeated Wandad Hurmuzd in a decisive battle in which Wandad Hurmuzd himself was wounded. The large number of Abbasid troops and Yazid al-Shaybani's military capability compelled Wandad Hurmuzd to surrender to Musa in Gorgan, on the condition of a pardon that his influence in Tabaristan would not be harmed. In return, he pledged to cease stirring up disturbances and attacking Abbasid garrisons.

al-Hadi took Wandad Hurmuzd with him to Baghdad, but al-Hadi delayed his return to Baghdad after he heard of the conspiracies being woven against him to remove him from the succession and transfer it to his brother Harun al-Rashid. al-Hadi did not return to Baghdad until he heard of his father al-Mahdi's death, whereupon he was proclaimed Caliph of the Muslims. Wandad Hurmuzd remained in Baghdad until Caliph al-Hadi heard news of the killing of Bahram ibn Firuz, one of the Iranians who had converted to Islam at al-Hadi's hands. Bahram's killer was Vindaspagan, brother of Prince Wandad Hurmuzd. al-Hadi demanded Wandad Hurmuzd's death in exchange for Bahram's killing, but Prince Wandad Hurmuzd managed to convince al-Hadi that this was a plot devised by his brother Vindaspagan to kill him, and begged him to send him to Tabaristan to capture his killer brother and send his head to the Caliph.As soon as Prince Wandad Hurmuzd reached Tabaristan, he advised his brother to flee and hide from view, while he remained in Tabaristan claiming he was trying to find him until Caliph al-Hadi died.

=== Second Phase of the Rebellion (801–805) ===
The relations between the Muslim governors and local rulers of Tabaristan became friendly for a period. Wandad Hurmuzd bought considerable amounts of land outside of Sari from the governor Jarid ibn Yazid. Tensions arose once again at the end of the reign of caliph Harun al-Rashid (r. 786–809). The Bavandids and Qarinvandids disallowed any Muslim to get buried in Tabaristan, and the soldiers of Sharwin I had killed the caliphal deputy of the region, who was the nephew of the governor Khalifa ibn Sa'id. In 805, Wandad Hurmuzd's brother Vindaspagan killed a Muslim tax collector who had been sent to inspect his villages.

Harun al-Rashid, who was at the city of Ray to address an issue with the governor of Khurasan, summoned the two rulers. There they both guaranteed their loyalty to the caliph, promising him to pay the land tax. On the request of Wandad Hurmuzd, Harun al-Rashid replaced the governor of Tabaristan. However, the new governor was instructed to confine the power of the local rulers to the highlands. Wandad Hurmuzd's son Qarin, as well Sharwin I's son Shahriyar, were taken to Baghdad as hostages as proof of their loyalty. After Harun al-Rashid's death in 809, they were returned to Tabaristan.

== Aftermath ==
By ca. 815, Abdallah ibn Khordadbeh served as the governor of Tabaristan, and conquered the mountainous regions of Tabaristan from the local Bavandid ruler Sharwin I. During the same year, he campaigned in Daylam, where he conquered two cities and captured its ruler Abu Layla. Shahriyar (now known as Shahriyar I), after succeeding his father sometime before 817, expelled the Qarinvand ruler Mazyar (a grandson of Wandad Hurmuzd) with the help of the latter's uncle Vinda-Umid ibn Vindaspagan. In 817, Abdallah aided Mazyar, to escape from Tabaristan and reach the court of the Abbasid caliph al-Ma'mun. In 822/3, Mazyar returned to Tabaristan with Abbasid reinforcements, and began to deal with his enemies—he had his brother Quhyar exiled, and did the same to Shahriyar I's son Qarin I, who was his nephew. In 825/6, Mazyar invaded the domains of the Bavandids, and captured Shahriyar's son and successor, Shapur. His uncle, Vinda-Umid, was also defeated, and shortly afterwards killed. Mazyar thus united the highlands under his own rule. He then assumed the titles of Gil-Gilan, Ispahbadh, and Padishkhwargarshah, all titles used by the 8th-century

Mazyar was later found to be one of Babak Khorramdin's allies, having supported Babak's rebellion against the Abbasid Caliphate. Following the suppression of Babak's rebellion, Mazyar himself rebelled against the Abbasids in Tabaristan, with one of his motives being the spread of Zoroastrianism. al-Mu'tasim then launched a campaign against Mazyar. After Ishaq ibn Ibrahim was dispateched, he suppressed Mazyar's rebellion and captured him. Upon capturing Mazyar, Ishaq ordered him to be transported on an elephant and escorted to the caliph in Samarra. Mazyar was later executed and crucified next to Babak in 840CE.

== Sources ==
- Akbar Shāh K̲h̲ān Najībābādī (2001). Ṣafī al-Raḥmān Mubārakfūrī, Abdul Rahman Abdullah (ed.). The History of Islam (Vol 2). Darussalam. ISBN 9960892883.
- Houtsma, Martijn Theodoor (1936), First Encyclopaedia of Islam 1913-1936: E.J.Brill's, BRILL, ISBN 90-04-09796-1, 9789004097964
- Madelung, W. (1975). "The Minor Dynasties of Northern Iran". In Frye, R. N. (ed.). The Cambridge History of Iran, Volume 4: From the Arab Invasion to the Saljuqs. Cambridge: Cambridge University Press. pp. 198–249. ISBN 978-0-521-20093-6.
- Melville, Charles (1997), EBN ESFANDĪĀR, BAHĀʾ-AL-DĪN MOḤAMMAD, vol. VIII, Iranica
- Thatcher, Griffithes Wheeler (1911). "Balādhurī" . In Chisholm, Hugh (ed.). Encyclopædia Britannica. Vol. 3 (11th ed.). Cambridge University Press. p. 233.
- Thatcher, Griffithes Wheeler (1911). "Ṭabarī" . In Chisholm, Hugh (ed.). Encyclopædia Britannica. Vol. 26 (11th ed.). Cambridge University Press. p. 322.
- Malek, Hodge M. (2004). The Dābūyid Ispahbads and Early 'Abbāsid Governors of Tabaristān: History and Numismatics. Royal Numismatic Society. ISBN 978-0-901405-83-8.
- Malek, Hodge Mehdi (2017). "Tabaristān During the 'Abbāsid Period: The Overlapping Coinage of the Governors and Other Officials (144-178H)". In Faghfoury, Mostafa (ed.). Iranian Numismatic Studies. A Volume in Honor of Stephen Album. Lancaster and London: Classical Numismatic Group. pp. 101–126.
- Malek, Hodge Mehdi (1995). "The Dabuyid Ispahbads of Tabaristan". The American Numismatic Society: 105–160.
- Bosworth, C. Edmund (1997). "EBN ḴORDĀḎBEH, ABU'L-QĀSEM ʿOBAYD-ALLĀH". Encyclopaedia Iranica, Vol. VIII, Fasc. 1. London et al.: C. Edmund Bosworth. pp. 37–38.
- Rekaya, M. (1997). "Ḳārinids". The Encyclopedia of Islam, New Edition, Volume IV: Iran–Kha. Leiden and New York: BRILL. pp. 644–647. ISBN 90-04-05745-5.
- Madelung, Wilferd (1984). "ĀL-E BĀVAND (BAVANDIDS)". Encyclopaedia Iranica, Vol. I, Fasc. 7. London u.a.: Routledge & Kegan Paul. pp. 747–753. ISBN 90-04-08114-3.
- Rekaya, M. (1986). "Khurshīd". In Bosworth, C. E.; van Donzel, E.; Lewis, B. & Pellat, Ch. (eds.). The Encyclopaedia of Islam, Second Edition. Volume V: Khe–Mahi. Leiden: E. J. Brill. pp. 68–70. ISBN 978-90-04-07819-2.
- Pourshariati, Parvaneh (2008). Decline and Fall of the Sasanian Empire: The Sasanian-Parthian Confederacy and the Arab Conquest of Iran. I.B. Tauris. ISBN 978-1-84511-645-3.
- Madelung, Wilfred (1993). "Dabuyids". Encyclopædia Iranica, Vol. VI, online edition, Fasc. 5. New York. pp. 541–544.
- Omar, Farouk (2009). الخلافة العباسية: عصر القوة والازدهار [The Abbasid Caliphate: The Era of Power and Prosperity] (in Arabic). Vol. 1. Dar Shorouq.
- Omar, Farouk (1967). The 'Abbasid Caliphate, 132/750-170/786. SAOS University of London.
- Bosworth, C. E., ed. (1991). The History of al-Ṭabarī, Volume XXXIII: Storm and Stress Along the Northern Frontiers of the ʿAbbāsid Caliphate: The Caliphate of al-Muʿtasim, A.D. 833–842/A.H. 218–227. SUNY Series in Near Eastern Studies. Albany, New York: State University of New York Press. ISBN 978-0-7914-0493-5.
- Crone, Patricia (2012). The Nativist Prophets of Early Islamic Iran. Cambridge, New York: Cambridge University Press.
