= Qarin I =

Eighth ruler of the Bavand dynasty

- Ispahbadh of the Bavand dynasty

Bavand ruler
- Reign: 839-867
- Predecessor: Mazyar (Qarinvand ruler)
- Successor: Rustam I
- Born: Tabaristan (presumably)
- Died: 867
- House: Bavand dynasty (Kayusiyya branch)
- Religion: Sunni Islam (after his conversion)

Qarin I (Persian: کارن), was the eighth ruler of the Bavand dynasty from 839 to 867.

== Biography ==
His brother, Shapur, was murdered in 825 by a Qarinvand named Mazyar, who then conquered his domains. With the aid of Abbasids and Tahirids, however, Qarin managed to reclaim his domains from Mazyar. During the same period, Mazyar was betrayed by his brother Quhyar, and was sentenced to death in Baghdad. In 842, Qarin converted to Islam, where he was rewarded with the title of Abu'l-Muluk.

In the 860s, western Iran was governed by the Tahirid Muhammad ibn Abdallah ibn Tahir, whose brother Sulayman ibn Abdallah ibn Tahir deputized him in Tabaristan and Gurgan. Popular resentment of the Tahirids' rule increased through the oppression of their officials, especially their fiscal agents in the province. Consequently, in 864 a rebellion broke out in the towns of Ruyan, Kalar and Chalus, led by two "sons of Rostam". The rebels called upon Hasan ibn Zayd, an Alid, to lead them, and allied themselves with the neighbouring Dailamites. Hasan, who assumed the regnal name al-Da‘ī ila’l-ḥaqq ("He who summons to the Truth"), was recognized as emir by a part of the local population, and even secured the allegiance of the Justanid king of Daylam, Vahsudan ibn Marzuban. Qarin, however, opposed Zaydid rule in Tabaristan, and allied himself with Sulayman ibn Abdallah ibn Tahir against Hasan, but was defeated by Hasan in a battle, who had Qarin's domains devastated and his brother Ja'far ibn Shahriyar killed. Qarin then had to swear loyalty to the Zaydids and send his two sons Surkhab ibn Qarin and Maziar ibn Qarin as hostages to the Zaydid court, but quickly mutinied against Hasan, and in 868, he was forced to flee to Kumis. Qarin I died in 867, and was succeeded by his son or grandson Rustam I.

== Sources ==
- Madelung, W. (1975). "The Minor Dynasties of Northern Iran". In Frye, R. N. (ed.). The Cambridge History of Iran, Volume 4: From the Arab Invasion to the Saljuqs. Cambridge: Cambridge University Press. pp. 198–249. ISBN 978-0-521-20093-6.
- Madelung, W. (1984). "ĀL-E BĀVAND (BAVANDIDS)". Encyclopaedia Iranica, Vol. I, Fasc. 7. London u.a.: Routledge & Kegan Paul. pp. 747–753. ISBN 90-04-08114-3.
- Bosworth, C.E. (1975). "The Ṭāhirids and Ṣaffārids". In Frye, R.N. (ed.). The Cambridge History of Iran, Volume 4: From the Arab Invasion to the Saljuqs. Cambridge: Cambridge University Press. pp. 90–135. ISBN 9780521200936.
- Buhl, Fr. (1986). "al-Ḥasan b. Zayd b. Muḥammad". The Encyclopedia of Islam, New Edition, Volume III: H–Iram. Leiden, and New York: BRILL. p. 245. ISBN 90-04-08118-6.

Regnal titles
Preceded by Mazyar	Bavand ruler 839–867	Succeeded by Rustam I
