= Surkhab II =

Surkhab II (Persian:سهراب دوم) was the fourth ruler of the Bavand dynasty from 755 to 772.

In 760, his overlords, the Dabuyids, under Khurshid of Tabaristan, revolted against the Abbasid Caliphate. Khurshid, was, however, defeated, and fled to Daylam, where he made a counterattack against the Abbasids, but was once again defeated.

After learning that his family was captured by the Abbasids, Khurshid poisoned himself. This marked the end of the Dabuyid dynasty; however, other dynasties such as the Bavandids, Karenids and Zarmihrids, all formerly subject to the Dabuyids, continued to control parts of Tabaristan as tributary vassals of the Abbasid government.

Surkhab II died in 772, and was succeeded by his son Sharwin I, who would later, along with the rulers of Tabaristan, revolt against the Abbasids and massacre Muslims in Tabaristan.

== Sources ==
- Madelung, W. (1975). "The Minor Dynasties of Northern Iran". In Frye, R.N. (ed.). The Cambridge History of Iran, Volume 4: From the Arab Invasion to the Saljuqs. Cambridge: Cambridge University Press. pp. 198–249. ISBN 978-0-521-20093-6.
- Madelung, W. (1984). "ĀL-E BĀVAND (BAVANDIDS)". Encyclopaedia Iranica, Vol. I, Fasc. 7. London u.a.: Routledge & Kegan Paul. pp. 747–753. ISBN 90-04-08114-3.

Preceded by Mihr Mardan	Bavand ruler 755–772	Succeeded by Sharwin I
