= Quhyar =

Monarch

Quhyar (Persian: کوه یار), was the ruler of the Qarinvand dynasty, ruling briefly in 839 until his assassination.

== Biography ==
Quhyar was the son of Qarin ibn Vindadhhurmuzd, and had a brother named Mazyar, who, after ascending the Qarinvand throne, was repelled from Tabaristan by his uncle Vinda-Umid and the Bavandid ruler Shahriyar I. However, Mazyar returned in 822/23 with the support of the Abbasid Caliphate to take revenge. Shapur, who was the son and successor of Shahriyar I, was defeated and killed along with Vinda-Umid. Mazyar then united Tabaristan under his own rule.

Mazyar, however, later rebelled against the Abbasid Caliphate, an act which was widely supported by the native Zoroastrians, who began plundering the Muslim villages. The Tahirid ruler Abdallah ibn Tahir al-Khurasani and the Abbasid caliph al-Mu'tasim shortly sent five corps that entered Tabaristan from all sides. Mazyar made his brother Quhyar as the defender of the Qarinvand mountains, and the Bavandid Qarin I as the defender of eastern Tabaristan. However, the fall of Tabaristan went quickly: several cities were caught by surprise, while Qarin I betrayed Mazyar and agreed to aid the Abbasids in exchange for being restored as the ruler of the Bavand dynasty. The people of Sari shortly revolted against Mazyar, and Quhyar betrayed Mazyar, and had him captured and given to al-Mu'tasim.

Mazyar was shortly brought to Samarra, where he was executed. His body later became gibbeted with the body of the Khurramite Babak Khorramdin. Quhyar, who had just ascended the Qarinvand throne, however, was shortly killed by his own Dailamite soldiers because of his betrayal against Mazyar. Although many scholars considered the death of Quhyar as the fall of the Qarinvand dynasty, the dynasty continued to rule in parts of Tabaristan, and a certain Baduspan ibn Gurdzad is mentioned in 864 as the ruler of the Qarinvand dynasty

== Sources ==
- Madelung, W. (1975). "The Minor Dynasties of Northern Iran". In Frye, R. N. (ed.). The Cambridge History of Iran, Volume 4: From the Arab Invasion to the Saljuqs. Cambridge: Cambridge University Press. pp. 198–249. ISBN 978-0-521-20093-6.
- Rekaya, M. (1997). "Ḳārinids". The Encyclopedia of Islam, New Edition, Volume IV: Iran–Kha. Leiden and New York: BRILL. pp. 644–647. ISBN 90-04-05745-5.
- Mottahedeh, Roy (1975). "The ʿAbbāsid Caliphate in Iran". In Frye, R. N. (ed.). The Cambridge History of Iran, Volume 4: From the Arab Invasion to the Saljuqs. Cambridge: Cambridge University Press. pp. 57–90. ISBN 978-0-521-20093-6.

Preceded by Mazyar	Qarinvand ruler 839	Succeeded by Unnamed Qarinvand prince
