= Padishkhwargar =

Sasanian province in late antiquity

- 224^{a} – 520; 520^{b} – 651
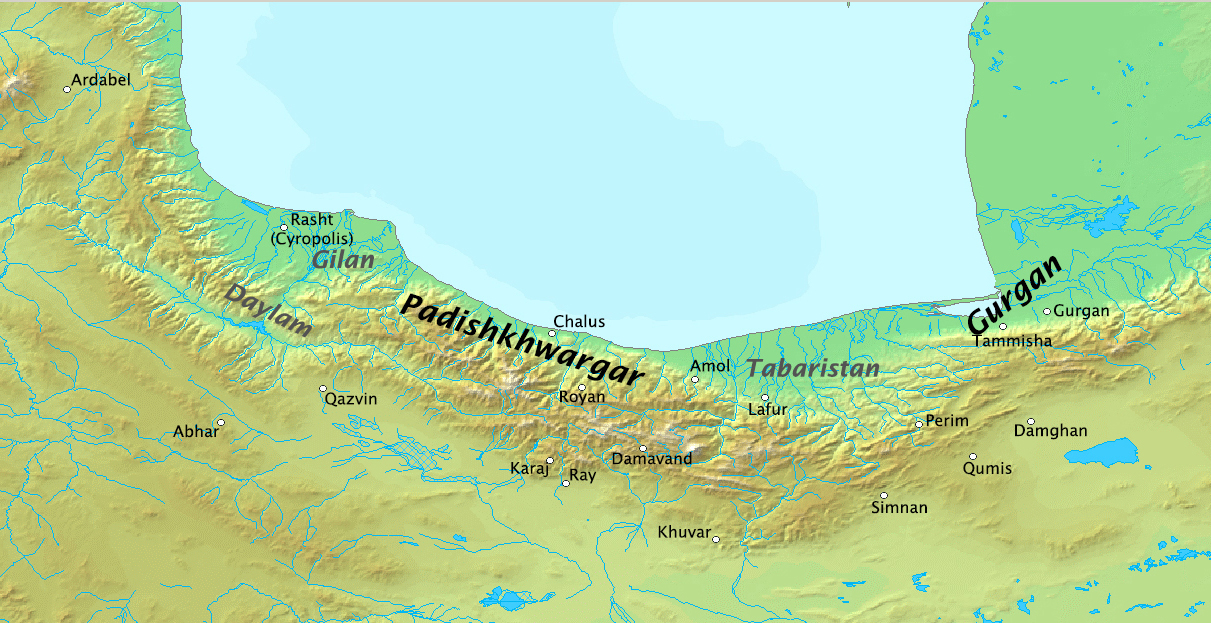
- Map of northern Iran under the Sasanians
- Capital: Amol; Chalus
- Common languages: Mazandarani; Gilaki; Daylami; Middle Persian
- Religion: Zoroastrianism; Iranian paganism Christianity
- Government: Monarchy
- Historical era: Antiquity
  - Established: 224
  - Disestablished: 651
Preceded by
Parthian Empire
Succeeded by
Dabuyid dynasty
Qarinvand dynasty
Zarmihrids
Bavand dynasty
- 1. Gushnasp becomes a Sasanian vassal in 224.; 2. End of the Gushnaspid line in 520; Kawus appointed as governor.

Padishkhwārgar or Parišwār was a Sasanian province in Late Antiquity, which almost corresponded to the present-day provinces of Mazandaran and Gilan. The province bordered Adurbadagan and Balasagan in the west, Gurgan in the east, and Spahan in south. The main cities of the province were Amol and Chalus.

The province functioned as some kind of vassal kingdom, being mostly ruled by princes from different royal families, who bore the title of Padashwargarshah ("Shah of Padishkhwargar").

== Name ==
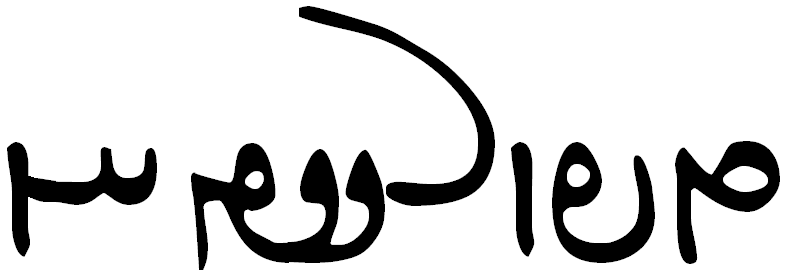
The name "Padishkhwargar" is the Bundahishn variation of its name, however, the Parthian version is "Parišxwār". On Shapur I's inscription at the Ka'ba-ye Zartosht the province is called Parishwar, whilst Islamic sources refer the region as Tabaristan, which derives from Middle Persian Tapurstān ( ).

== History ==
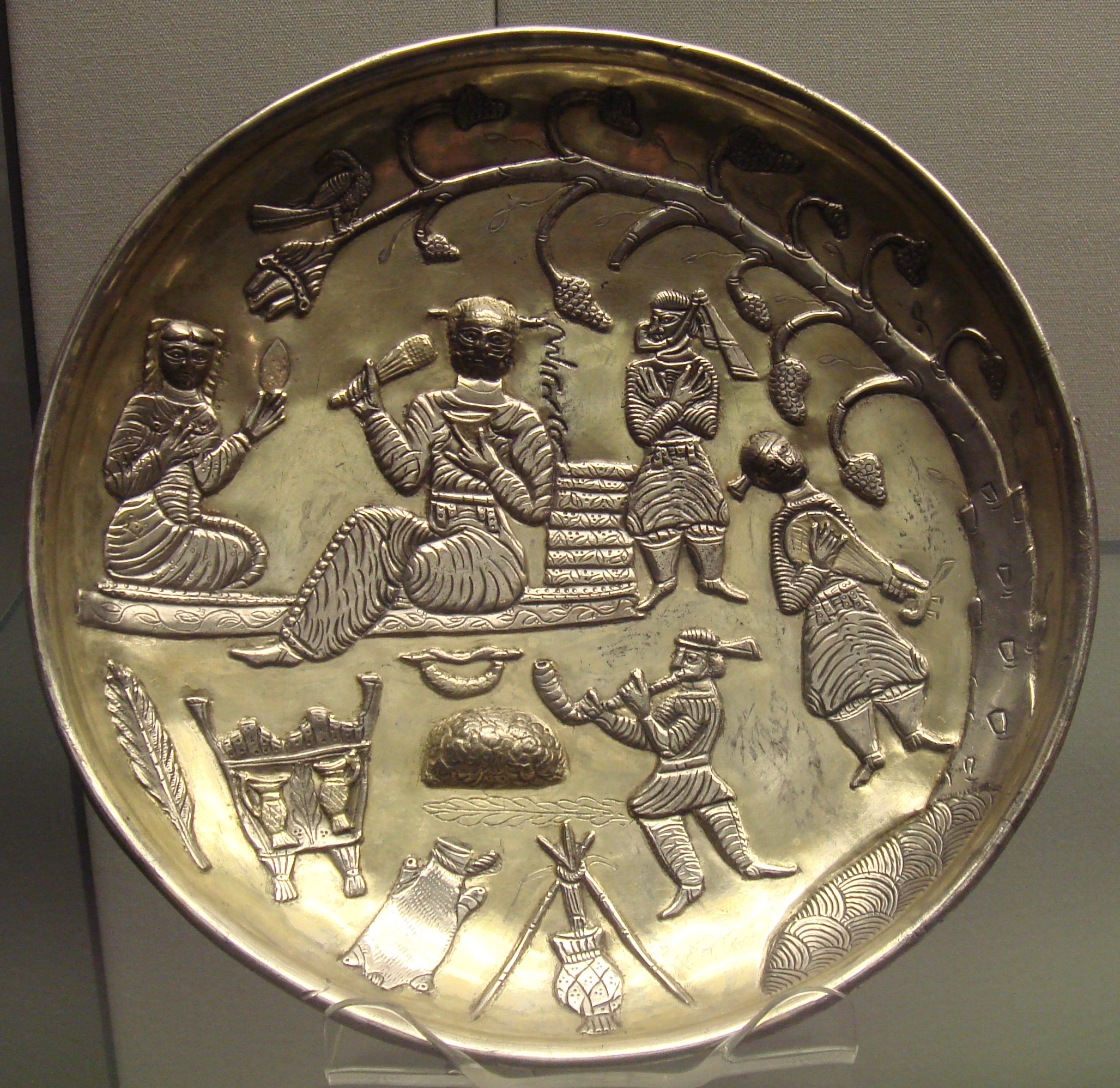
Silver gilt dish from Padishkhwargar, 7th–8th centuries. A tradition initiated under the Sasanian Empire and continued after the Arab invasions. "Anuzhad" inscription in Pahlavi script, next to the reclining figure. British Museum.

During the rise of the Sasanian dynasty, Padishkhwargar was ruled by a certain Gushnasp, who aided his suzerain the Parthian ruler Artabanus V (r. 213–224) in his struggle with the first Sasanian king (shah) Ardashir I (r. 224–242) over the control of Iran. Artabanus V was eventually defeated and killed, and Gushnasp was made a Sasanian vassal. Gilan, which was never fully incorporated into the Sasanian Empire, still posed a problem for the Sasanians, as Ardashir's son and successor Shapur I (r. 240–270) had to make an expedition into the region in 242/3. The dynasty of Gushnasp continued to rule Padishkhwargar until c. 520, when the Sasanian prince Kawus was made the new ruler of the province. After returning from an expedition in Zabulistan, Kawus rebelled in c. 532 against his recently crowned brother Khosrow I (r. 531–579), claiming himself as the rightful ruler of the empire due to being the elder brother. He was defeated and executed the following year. In the 550s, Karin, a member of the House of Karen, received land to the south of Amol by Khosrow I, thus starting the Qarinvand dynasty.

== Population ==
The western portion of Padishkhwargar included Gilan and Daylam, which was populated by the Gilaks and Daylamites, who were most likely adherents of some form of Iranian paganism, while a minority of them were Zoroastrian and Christian. According to al-Biruni, they "lived by the rule laid down by the mythical Afridun." They were often associated with each other, and regularly served the Sasanian military as mercenaries, but never fully came under their suzerainty. They both spoke a northern Iranian dialect that was mostly unintelligible with Persian. The Cadusii, who had mixed with Gilaks, lived from the Caspian coast into the mountains. Mazandaran was populated by the Amardi and Tapur tribe, who had intermingled. The non-Iranian tribes of Amariacae and Dribices that lived from the range of Amol to Gurgan, had most likely been assimilated by the Iranians into a prevalent Mazandarani population.

== Sources ==
- Brunner, Christopher (1983). "Geographical and Administrative divisions: Settlements and Economy". The Cambridge History of Iran: The Seleucid, Parthian, and Sasanian periods (2). Cambridge: Cambridge University Press. pp. 747–778. ISBN 978-0-521-24693-4.
- Pourshariati, Parvaneh (2008). Decline and Fall of the Sasanian Empire: The Sasanian-Parthian Confederacy and the Arab Conquest of Iran. London and New York: I.B. Tauris. ISBN 978-1-84511-645-3.
- Madelung, Wilferd; Felix, Wolfgang (1995). "DEYLAMITES". Encyclopaedia Iranica, Vol. BII, Fasc. 4. pp. 342–347.
- Daryaee, Touraj (2008). Sasanian Persia: The Rise and Fall of an Empire. I.B.Tauris. pp. 1–240. ISBN 978-0857716668.
- Madelung, Wilferd (2001). "GĪLĀN iv. History in the Early Islamic Period". Encyclopaedia Iranica, Vol. X, Fasc. 6. pp. 634–635.
- Frye, Richard N. (1983). "The political history of Iran under the Sasanians". The Cambridge History of Iran: The Seleucid, Parthian, and Sasanian periods (1). Cambridge: Cambridge University Press. pp. 116–181. ISBN 978-0-521-24693-4.
