= Muhammad ibn Zayd =

8th-century ruler of part of Iran

Emir of Tabaristan
- Reign: 6 January 884 – 3 October 900
- Predecessor: Hasan ibn Zayd
- Successor: Samanid occupation Hasan al-Utrush
- Died: 3 October 900
- House: Zaydid dynasty
- Father: Zayd ibn Muhammad
- Mother: Amina bint Abd Allah
- Religion: Zaydi Shi'a Islam

Abū ʿAbd Allāh Muḥammad ibn Zayd ibn Muḥammad ibn Ismaʿīl ibn al-Ḥasan ibn Zayd (died 3 October 900), also known as al-Dāʿī al-Ṣaghīr ("the Younger Missionary"), was an Alid who succeeded his brother, Hasan ("the Elder Missionary"), as ruler of the Zaydid dynasty of Tabaristan in 884. Little is known of his early life, before coming to Tabaristan after Hasan established Zaydid rule there in 864. He served his brother as a general and governor, and continued his policies after his accession. His reign was troubled by rebellions and wars, most notably by the invasion of Rafi' ibn Harthama in 889–892, which occupied most of his domains. After Rafi' fell out of favour with the Abbasids, Muhammad recovered his position and secured the allegiance of Rafi', but did not particularly support him against the Saffarids. In 900, following the Saffarids' defeat by the Samanids, he tried to invade Khurasan, but was defeated and died of his wounds, whereupon Tabaristan fell to the Samanids.

== Early life and career under Hasan ==
Muhammad was the younger brother of Hasan ibn Zayd, an Alid who founded Zaydid rule over Tabaristan in 864. Nothing is known of his early life. Iranologist Wilferd Madelung speculates that the family lived in Iraq before coming to Tabaristan after Hasan's takeover of the province; Muhammad appears to have come to Tabaristan in 867.

During Hasan's rule, Muhammad is mentioned as being captured by Ya'qub ibn al-Layth al-Saffar during the latter's 874 invasion, but released at Gurgan when Ya'qub withdrew in 876. After a brief visit to Tabaristan to see his mother, he returned to Gurgan as an assistant to Hasan's brother-in-law, Muhammad ibn Ibrahim. The Zaydids were expelled from Gurgan by the Tahirid general Ishaq al-Sari in spring 877, but soon recovered it. In 880, Muhammad also suppressed the rebellion of Rustam I, a member of the native Bavandid dynasty which ruled the mountains of eastern Tabaristan and opposed the Zaydids. He then suppressed a rebellion in Gurgan headed by another Alid, Hasan ibn Muhammad ibn Ja'far al-Aqiqi, and probably continued to govern the province in his brother's name until the latter's death on 6 January 884.

Due to Muhammad's absence in Gurgan, upon Hasan's death power in Tabaristan was usurped by his brother-in-law, Abu'l-Husayn Ahmad ibn Muhammad, who proclaimed himself as the legitimate emir. Muhammad was prevented from returning to Tabaristan straight away by a mutiny by his Daylamite troops, and was able to regain control of Gurgan itself only through the aid of the former Tahirid general and now ruler of Khurasan, Rafi' ibn Harthama. Finally, in October 884 Muhammad was able to return to Tabaristan, seize the capital Amul, and behead the usurper.

== Reign ==
Muhammad assumed the same regnal name as his brother, al-Dāʿī ilaʾl-Ḥaqq ("He who summons to the Truth"), and was known as al-Dāʿī al-Ṣaghīr ("the Younger Missionary") in contrast to Hasan (al-Dāʿī al-Kabīr, "the Elder Missionary"). He is also found in some sources as al-Qāʾim bi al-Ḥaqq ("Upholder of the Truth"). Muhammad now attacked Rustam, who had supported the usurper Ahmad, and drove him from his domains to seek refuge at the Saffarid court. With Saffarid mediation, Rustam was allowed to return.

Like his brother, Muhammad tried to expand his domain by military means, and campaigns occupied a large part of his reign. In August 885 he tried to capture Rayy from its Turkish ruler Asategin, but was driven back. Rafi' ibn Harthama used the opportunity to occupy Gurgan, but Muhammad recovered control of the province as soon as Rafi' departed it. In 888 or 889, Muhammad again attacked Rustam, who now fled to Rafi' and sought his aid. Rafi' launched a major invasion of the Zaydid domains and conquered most of them, forcing Muhammad, like his brother before him, to seek shelter in the mountain fortresses of the western districts. Muhammad also gained the support of Justan ibn Vahsudan, lord of Daylam. With his aid, Muhammad engaged in constant fighting with Rafi', but was unable to recover his realm. Eventually, Rafi' struck a peace with Justan, and the Daylamites too withdrew. At this point, Muhammad's fortunes changed, with the accession of a new Caliph, al-Mu'tadid, on the Abbasid throne in 892. Fearful of Ibn Harthama's power, the Caliph stripped him of the governorship of Khurasan and gave it to his rival, the Saffarid Amr ibn al-Layth. In response, Rafi' concluded a peace with Muhammad, returned Tabaristan (but not Gurgan) to him and even pledged allegiance to the Zaydid cause. Muhammad re-entered Amul on 24 June 893. Despite their alliance, Muhammad refrained from aiding Rafi' in his wars with the Saffarids, and the two fell out and clashed again briefly when Muhammad tried to recover Sari as well. After their reconciliation, Rafi' even tortured and killed Muhammad's old adversary Rustam in 895, and in 896, when his forces briefly conquered Nishapur, the Friday prayer was read in Muhammad's name. Rafi' was killed shortly after by his rivals the Saffarids, whereupon Muhammad recovered Gurgan as well.

In 897, Muhammad provided refuge to Bakr ibn Abd al-Aziz, a scion of the deposed Dulafid dynasty of Isfahan. Initially, Muhammad received him with honours and even gave him the governorship of the towns of Chalus and Ruyan, but in 898 he had Bakr poisoned. In 900, the balance of power in the region changed abruptly with the defeat and death of the Saffarid Amr ibn al-Layth by the Samanids in April of that year. The Samanids now demanded the cession of Gurgan, while Muhammad was planning to exploit the turmoil and invade Khurasan himself. Muhammad and his army met with Samanid army under Muhammad ibn Harun al-Sarakhsi at Gurgan, and in the ensuing battle, the Samanids prevailed, and the severely wounded Muhammad was captured. He died on the next day, 3 October 900 (or in August, according to Abu'l-Faraj). His corpse was decapitated, and while his head was sent to the Samanid court at Bukhara, his body was buried at the gate of Gurgan. Within a short time, as al-Mas'udi reports, his tomb became a centre of pilgrimage.

As Muhammad's son and designated heir Zayd was also captured and sent to Bukhara, the Zaydid leaders agreed to name Zayd's infant son al-Mahdi as their ruler, but dissension broke out among their ranks: one of them proclaimed himself for the Abbasids instead, and his troops attacked and massacred the Zaydid supporters. Instead, the Samanids took over the province. The Samanid conquest brought along a restoration of Sunni Islam in the province, but the Shi'a cause was upheld and spread among the Daylamites and Gilanites by another Alid, Hasan al-Utrush, who in 914 managed to conquer Tabaristan and restore Zaydid rule.

== Religious policies and character ==
Like his brother, Muhammad espoused and promoted Zaydi Shi'ism and Mu'tazilism, while repressing Sunni opposition. This religious oppression, combined with their reliance on the Daylamite mountaineers, whose lack of discipline and barbarous behaviour were much resented by the populace, resulted in an estrangement of the mass of the people from Zaydid rule. Muhammad achieved some prominence among the Shi'ites by sponsoring the rebuilding of the shrine to Ali and his son Husayn after its destruction by the Abbasids, as well as by his liberal donations to other members of the Alid family across the Muslim world. Nevertheless, the later Zaydis do not consider either him or Hasan as legitimate imams.

Despite his religious fervour, he does not seem to have been a resolute enemy of the Abbasids; according to a story, the Caliph al-Mu'tadid was saddened by Muhammad's death. Muhammad was also a cultured man, who appreciated good poetry and even composed poems of his own, of which only a few lines survive, recorded by al-Suli.

== Death ==
Ismail decided to take advantage of the caliph's grant by sending an army to Tabaristan, which was then controlled by the Zaydids under Muhammad ibn Zayd. Muhammad and his army met the Samanid army under Muhammad ibn Harun al-Sarakhsi at Gurgan, and in the ensuing battle, the Samanids prevailed, and the severely wounded Muhammad was captured. He died on the next day, 3 October 900 (or in August, according to Abu'l-Faraj).

== Sources ==
- Bosworth, C. E.; van Donzel, E.; Heinrichs, W. P. & Pellat, Ch., eds. (1993). "Muḥammad b. Zayd". The Encyclopaedia of Islam, Second Edition. Volume VII: Mif–Naz. Leiden: E. J. Brill. pp. 417–418. ISBN 978-90-04-09419-2.
- Bosworth, C.E. (1975). "The Ṭāhirids and Ṣaffārids". In Frye, Richard N. (ed.). The Cambridge History of Iran: From the Arab Invasion to the Saljuqs. Vol. 4. Cambridge: Cambridge University Press. pp. 90–135. ISBN 0-521-20093-8.
- Madelung, W. (1975). "The Minor Dynasties of Northern Iran". In Frye, Richard N. (ed.). The Cambridge History of Iran: From the Arab Invasion to the Saljuqs. Vol. 4. Cambridge: Cambridge University Press. pp. 198–249. ISBN 0-521-20093-8.
- Madelung, W. (1993). "DĀʿĪ ELAʾL-ḤAQQ, ABŪ ʿABD ALLĀH MOḤAMMAD". In Yarshater, Ehsan (ed.). Encyclopædia Iranica. Vol. VI/6: Daf(f) and Dāyera–Dārā. London and New York: Routledge & Kegan Paul. pp. 595–597. ISBN 978-1-56859-004-2.
