= Tatoid dialects =

Tati dialects of Iran

Tatoid
- South Alborz, Tabaroid
- دیلمی (Deylami)
- Language family: Indo-European: Indo-Iranian; Iranian; Western Iranian; Northwestern Iranian; Tatic; Daylami?; Tatoid
- Dialects: Gozarkhani; Rudbari; Taleqani; other dialects

Language codes
- ISO 639-3: –

The Tatoid dialects, also known as the Tabaroid dialects, South Alborz varieties, or simply as Deylami, are dialects of the Tatic group of Northwestern Iranian languages spoken in the Iranian provinces of Gilan, Qazvin and Alborz. Tatoid includes the Rudbari (not to be confused with Rudbaraki, related to Gilaki), Taleqani and Alamuti dialects, among others. According to Stilo, Rudbari and Taleqani were originally dialects of the Tati language which, under the intense influences of Caspian and Persian, lost all the structural hallmarks of Tati.

== Alamuti dialect ==
According to some sources, the people in northern Qazvin (Alamut) speak a dialect of the Tati language. However, other sources state that the people of Alamut are Mazanderani or Gilaks who speak a dialect of the Mazandarani or Gilaki language. According to some linguists, the term ‘Tati’ was used by Turkic speakers to refer to non-Turkic speakers. While the ‘Tatoid dialect’ of Alamut has been postulated to be a dialect of Mazandarani, the ASI and Glottlog place it under the Tatic group.

== See also ==
- Tati language
- Tat people (Iran)
- Northwestern Iranian languages
