= Rustam I =

- Ispahbadh of the Bavand dynasty
- Reign: 867–896
- Predecessor: Qarin I
- Successor: Sharwin II
- Born: Unknown; Tabaristan
- Died: 896; Astarabad
- House: Bavand dynasty
- Father: Qarin I or Surkhab
- Religion: Sunni Islam

Rustam I (Persian: رستم), was the ninth ruler of the Bavand dynasty from 867 to 896. He was the successor and son (or grandson) of Qarin I.

== Biography ==
Like his father, Rustam opposed the Zaydi rulers of Tabaristan, and in 879, revolted against them. Rustam then seized Kumis from Qasim ibn Ali, and urged Ahmad ibn Abdallah al-Khujistani, the ruler of Nishapur, to invade Tabaristan.

Ahmad ibn Abdallah accepted, and captured Gurgan, while Rustam occupied Astarabad, but a sudden attack by the Zaydi emir Hasan ibn Zayd forced Rustam to flee to the mountains; Hasan's brother Muhammad ibn Zayd chased Rustam and forced him to accept his suzerainty and not raise an army any more. After the death of Hasan in 884, Rustam supported Abu'l-Husayn Ahmad ibn Muhammad as the successor of Hasan ibn Zayd. However, Muhammad ibn Zayd managed to defeat Abu'l-Husayn after ten months, and then attacked Rustam and forced him to flee Tabaristan. Rustam then took refuge with the Saffarid emir Amr ibn al-Layth. With Saffarid mediation, Rustam was allowed to return to his domains.

Like his brother, Muhammad tried to expand his domain by military means, and campaigns occupied a large part of his reign. In August 885 he tried to capture Rayy from its Turkish ruler Asategin, but was driven back. Rafi' ibn Harthama, a former Tahirid soldier, used the opportunity to occupy Gurgan, but Muhammad recovered control of the province as soon as Rafi' departed it. In 888 or 889, Muhammad once again attacked Rustam, but the latter managed to once again flee, and this time he sought aid from Rafi'. Rafi', along with Rustam, launched a major invasion of the Zaydi domains and conquered most of them, forcing Muhammad, like his brother before him, to seek shelter in the mountain fortresses of the western districts. Muhammad also gained the support of Jostan ibn Wahsudan, the Justanid ruler of Daylam. With his aid, Muhammad engaged in constant fighting with Rafi', but was unable to recover his realm. Eventually, Rafi' struck a peace with Jostan, and the Daylamites too withdrew. At this point, Muhammad's fortunes changed, with the accession of a new Caliph, al-Mu'tadid, on the Abbasid throne in 892. Fearful of Rafi's power, the Caliph stripped him of the governorship of Khurasan and gave it to his rival, the Saffarid Amr ibn al-Layth. In response, Rafi' concluded a peace with Muhammad, returned Tabaristan (but not Gurgan) to him and even pledged allegiance to the Zaydi cause. Rustam, after hearing about Rafi's alliance with his rival Muhammad, then allied with Amr ibn al-Layth.

In 896, Rafi' lured Rustam to Astarabad, where he had him tortured and killed. Rustam I was then succeeded by his son Sharwin II.

== In popular culture ==
- He's seen as "Vālī Rostam Qarinzade" in the Paradox Interactive game Crusader Kings III. He is a bookmark character in the 867 start date.

== Sources ==
- Madelung, W. (1975). "The Minor Dynasties of Northern Iran". In Frye, R.N. (ed.). The Cambridge History of Iran, Volume 4: From the Arab Invasion to the Saljuqs. Cambridge: Cambridge University Press. pp. 198–249. ISBN 978-0-521-20093-6.
- Madelung, W. (1993). "DĀʿĪ ELAʾL-ḤAQQ, ABŪ ʿABD ALLĀH MOḤAMMAD". In Yarshater, Ehsan (ed.). Encyclopaedia Iranica, Vol. VI, Fasc. 6. London et al.: Routledge & Kegan Paul. pp. 595–597. ISBN 1568590075.
- Madelung, W. (1984). "ĀL-E BĀVAND (BAVANDIDS)". Encyclopaedia Iranica, Vol. I, Fasc. 7. London u.a.: Routledge & Kegan Paul. pp. 747–753. ISBN 90-04-08114-3.

Preceded by Qarin I	Bavand ruler 867–896	Succeeded by Sharwin II
