= Mihr Mardan =

Mihr Mardan (Persian: مهر مردان) was the third ruler of the Bavand dynasty from 717 to 755. Nothing more is known about him; he died in 755, and was succeeded by his son Surkhab II.

== Sources ==
- Madelung, W. (1975). "The Minor Dynasties of Northern Iran". In Frye, R.N. (ed.). The Cambridge History of Iran, Volume 4: From the Arab Invasion to the Saljuqs. Cambridge: Cambridge University Press. pp. 198–249. ISBN 978-0-521-20093-6.

Preceded by Surkhab I	Bavand ruler 717–755	Succeeded by Surkhab II
