= Al-Daylami =

Al-Daylami or al-Dailami (الديلمي) is a nisba indicating a Dailamite or a person from Daylam. It may refer to:

- Fayruz al-Daylami companion of the Islamic prophet Muhammad.
- Nafi Mawla Ibn Umar, Tabi'un scholar and narrator of Hadith
- Muta of Daylam, king of Daylam
- John of Dailam, 7th-century East Syriac Christian saint and monk
- Al-Farra', 8/9th-century Kufan scholar
- Imad al-Dawla Daylami, founder of the Buyid dynasty (r. 934–949)
- 'Adud al-Dawla Daylami, emir of the Buyid dynasty (r. 949–983)
- Abu'l-Fath an-Nasir ad-Dailami, Zaidi imam in Yemen (r. 1038–1053)
- Abu'l-Hasan Mihyar al-Daylami 11th-century Arabic-language poet
- Abū Manṣūr al-Daylamī, 12th-century Islamic scholar and author of Musnad al-Firdous
- Malek Deylami, 16th century scrivener and calligrapher
- Kushyar Daylami, (971–1029; a.k.a. Kūshyār Daylami), Persian astronomer
