= Gozarkhani language =

Moribund Iranian language of Iran

Gozarkhani
- Alamuti
- Native to: Iran
- Language family: Indo-European: Indo-Iranian; Iranian; Western; Northwestern; Tatic; Daylami?; Tatoid; Gozarkhani
- Writing system: Unwritten

Language codes
- ISO 639-3: goz
- Glottolog: goza1238
- ELP: Gozarkhani

Gozarkhani or Alamuti, is a moribund Northwestern Iranian language and is a part of the Tatic group of Iranian vernaculars. It is a Tatoid dialect.
