= Rudbari language =

Rudbari (Rudbāri) may be any of several Iranian dialects:

- Rudbaraki or Kelardashti, a dialect (or closely related language) of Gilaki
- Rudbari, variously classified as a dialect of Mazanderani or of Tati
