= Daylamites =

Medieval Iranian people of northern Iran

The Daylamites or Dailamites (Middle Persian: Daylamīgān; Persian: دیلمیان Deylamiyān) were an Iranian people inhabiting the Daylam—the mountainous regions of northern Iran on the southwest coast of the Caspian Sea, now comprising the southeastern half of Gilan Province.

The Daylamites were a warlike people skilled in close combat. They were employed as soldiers by the Sasanian Empire and by the subsequent Muslim empires. Daylam and Gilan were the only regions to successfully resist the Muslim conquest of Persia, although many Daylamite soldiers outside Daylam accepted Islam. In the 9th century many Daylamites adopted Zaidi Islam. In the 10th century some adopted Isma'ilism, then in the 11th century Fatimid Isma'ilism and subsequently Nizari Isma'ilism. Both the Zaidis and the Nizaris maintained a strong presence in Iran up until the 16th century rise of the Safavids who espoused the Twelver sect of Shia Islam. In the 930s, the Daylamite Buyid dynasty emerged and managed to gain control over much of modern-day Iran, which it held until the coming of the Seljuk Turks in the mid-11th century.

== Origins and language ==
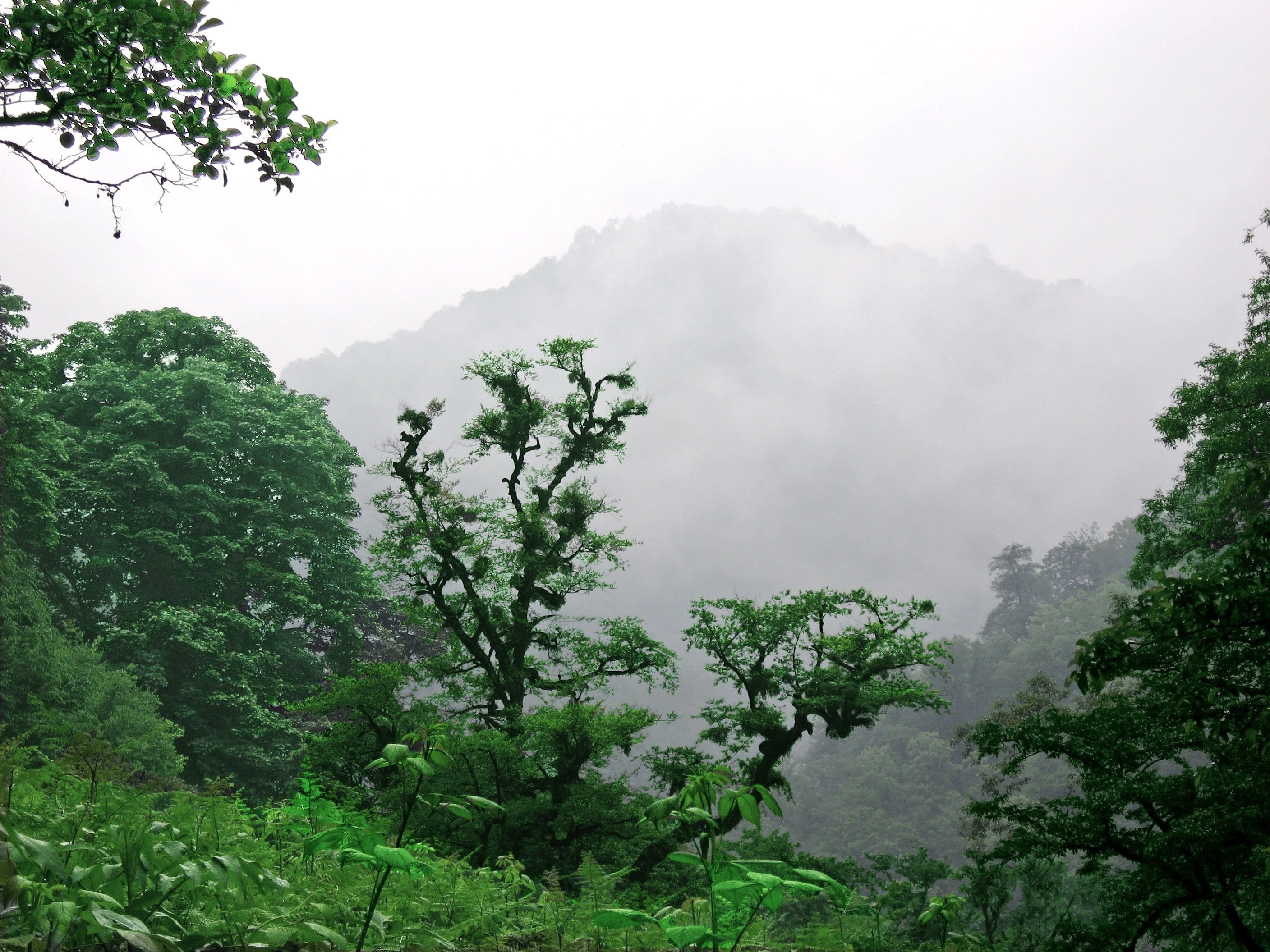
Rainforest on the western edge of Daylam.

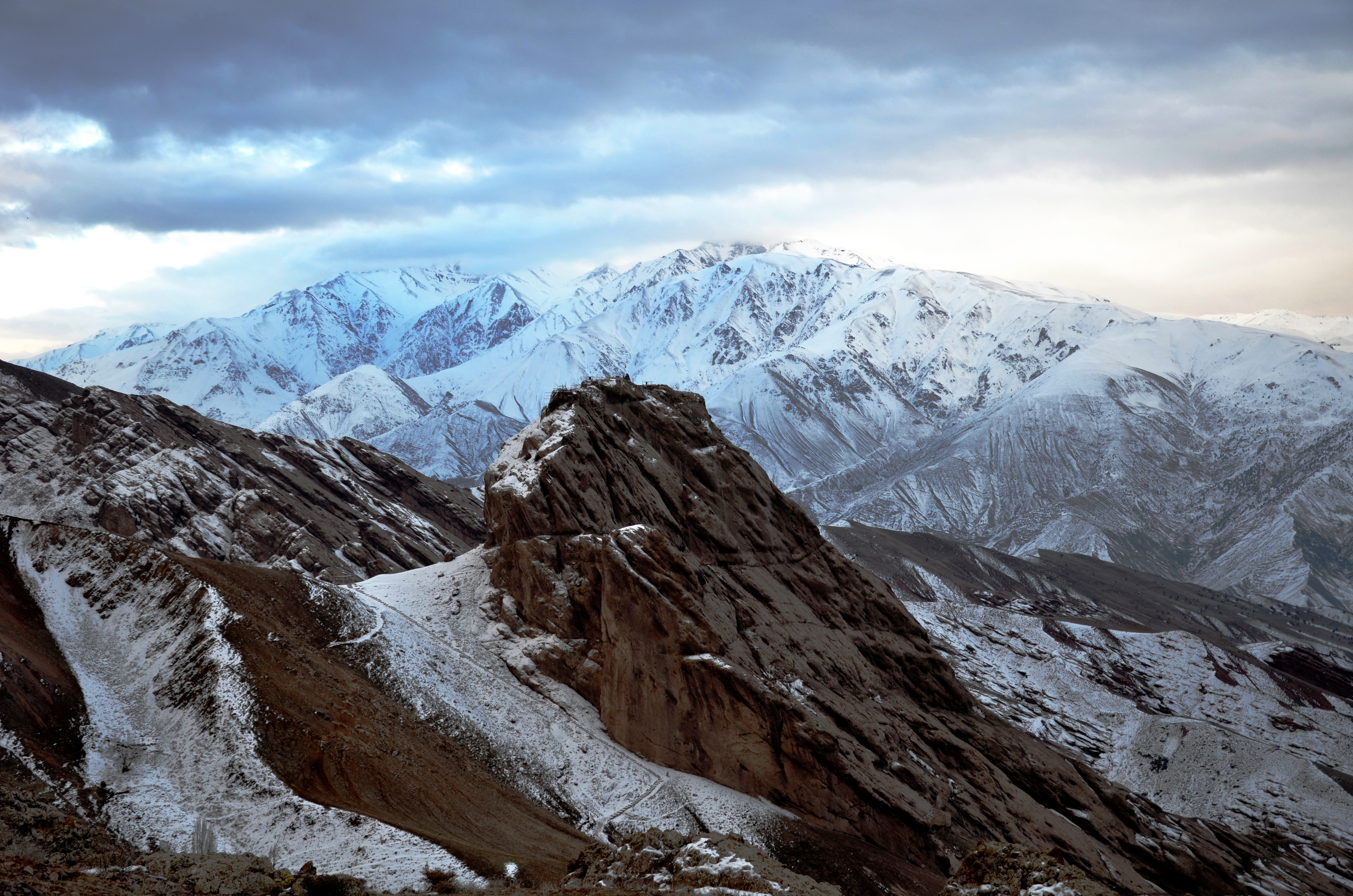
Alamut Castle located to the southeast of Daylam in Alamut.

The Daylamites lived in the highlands of Daylam, part of the Alborz range, between Tabaristan and Gilan.

They spoke the Daylami language, a now-extinct Northwestern Iranian language similar to that of the neighbouring Gilites. The term "Deylami" is most closely associated with the South Alborz varieties (like Gozarkhani) spoken in the historical region of Daylam, even though it is sometimes applied to Galeshi and, by extension, Eastern Gilaki as a whole.

During the Sasanian Empire, they were employed as high-quality infantry. According to the Byzantine historians Procopius and Agathias, they were a warlike people and skilled in close combat, being armed each with a sword, a shield, and spears or javelins.

== History ==
=== Pre-Islamic period ===
==== Seleucid and Parthian period ====
The Daylamites first appear in historical records in the late 2nd century BC, where they are mentioned by Polybius, who erroneously calls them "Elamites" (Ἐλυμαῖοι) instead of "Daylamites" (Δελυμαῖοι). In the Middle Persian prose Kar-Namag i Ardashir i Pabagan, the last ruler of the Parthian Empire, Artabanus V (r. 208–224) summoned all the troops from Ray, Damavand, Daylam, and Padishkhwargar to fight the newly established Sasanian Empire. According to the Letter of Tansar, during this period, Daylam, Gilan, and Ruyan belonged to the kingdom of Gushnasp, who was a Parthian vassal but later submitted to the first Sasanian emperor Ardashir I (r. 224–242).

==== Sasanian period ====
Map showing Daylam (far right) under the Sasanian Empire.

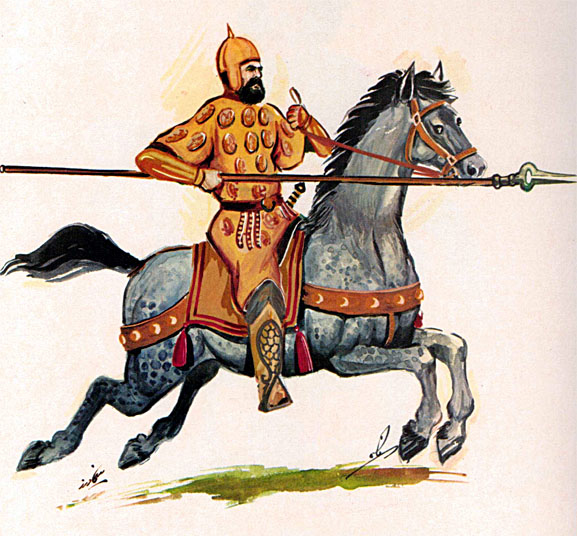
A depiction of a Daylamite cavalryman from an Iranian textbook.

The descendants of Gushnasp were still ruling until in ca. 520, when Kavadh I (r. 488–531) appointed his eldest son, Kawus, as the king of the former lands of the Gushnaspid dynasty. In 522, Kavadh I sent an army under a certain Buya (known as Boes in Byzantine sources) against Vakhtang I of Iberia. This Buya was a native of Daylam, which is proven by the fact that he bore the title wahriz, a Daylamite title also used by Khurrazad, the Daylamite military commander who conquered Yemen in 570 during the reign of Khosrow I (r. 531-579), and his Daylamite troops would later play a significant role in the conversion of Yemen to the nascent Islam. The 6th-century Byzantine historian Procopius described the Daylamites as;

"barbarians who live...in the middle of Persia, but have never become subject to the king of the Persians. For their abode is on sheer mountainsides which are altogether inaccessible, and so they have continued to be autonomous from ancient times down to the present day; but they always march with the Persians as mercenaries when they go against their enemies. And they are all foot-soldiers, each man carrying a sword and shield and three javelins in his hand (De Bello Persico 8.14.3-9)."

The equipment of the Dailamites of the Sasanian army included swords, shield, battle-axe (tabar-zīn), slings, daggers, pikes, and two-pronged javelins (zhūpīn).

Daylamites also took part in the siege of Archaeopolis in 552. They supported the rebellion of Bahrām Chōbin against Khosrow II, but he later employed an elite detachment of 4000 Daylamites as part of his guard. They also distinguished themselves at the Yemeni campaign of Wahriz and in the battles against the forces of Justin II.

Some Muslim sources maintain that following the Sasanian defeat in the Battle of al-Qādisiyyah, the 4000-strong Daylamite contingent of the Sasanian guard, along with other Iranian units, defected to the Arab side, converting to Islam.

=== Islamic period ===
==== Resistance to the Arabs ====
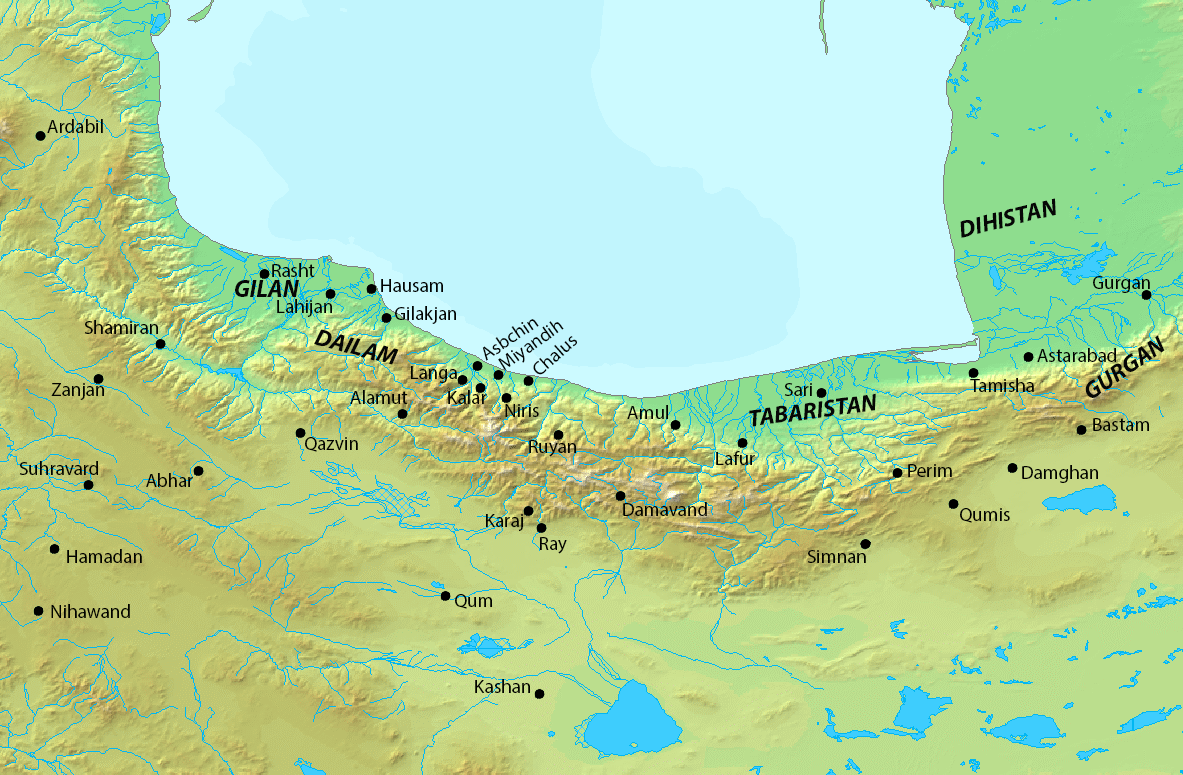
Map of the Caspian coast of Iran during the Iranian Intermezzo.

The Daylamites managed to resist the Arab invasion of their own mountainous homeland for several centuries under their own local rulers. Warfare in the region was endemic, with raids and counter-raids by both sides. Under the Arabs, the old Iranian fortress-city of Qazvin continued in its Sasanian-era role as a bulwark against Daylamite raids. According to the historian al-Tabari, Daylamites and Turkic peoples were considered the worst enemies of the Arab Muslims. The Abbasid Caliphate penetrated the region and occupied parts of it, but their control was never very effective. After Abbasid occupation of Tabaristan, The military success achieved by the Abbasids in Daylam was not of practical benefit, as the rebels continued to attack the southern regions where the Abbasid garrisons were stationed. This prompted Caliph al-Mansur to declare jihad in 143 AH (759/760 CE) and sent messengers to Basra and Kufa to rally the people and call upon them to reinforce the army. The campaign was led by Muhammad ibn Abi al-Abbas, and when it reached Mosul, fighters from Mosul and the Jazira region in general joined it. However, this campaign and others achieved nothing in the Daylam region except for some spoils of war and captives that the soldiers were able to obtain during their skirmishes with the local population.

Shortly after 781, the Nestorian monk Shubhalishoʿ began evangelizing the Daylamites and converting them to Christianity. He and his associates made only a little headway before encountering competition from Islam. During the reign of Harun al-Rashid (r. 785–809), several Shia Muslims fled to the largely pagan Daylamites, with a few Zoroastrians and Christians, to escape persecution. Among these refugees were some Alids, who began the gradual conversion of the Daylamites to Shia Islam. Nevertheless, a strong Iranian identity remained ingrained in the peoples of the region, along with an anti-Arab mentality. Local rulers such as the Buyids and the Ziyarids, made a point of celebrating old Iranian and Zoroastrian festivals.

==== The Daylamite expansion ====
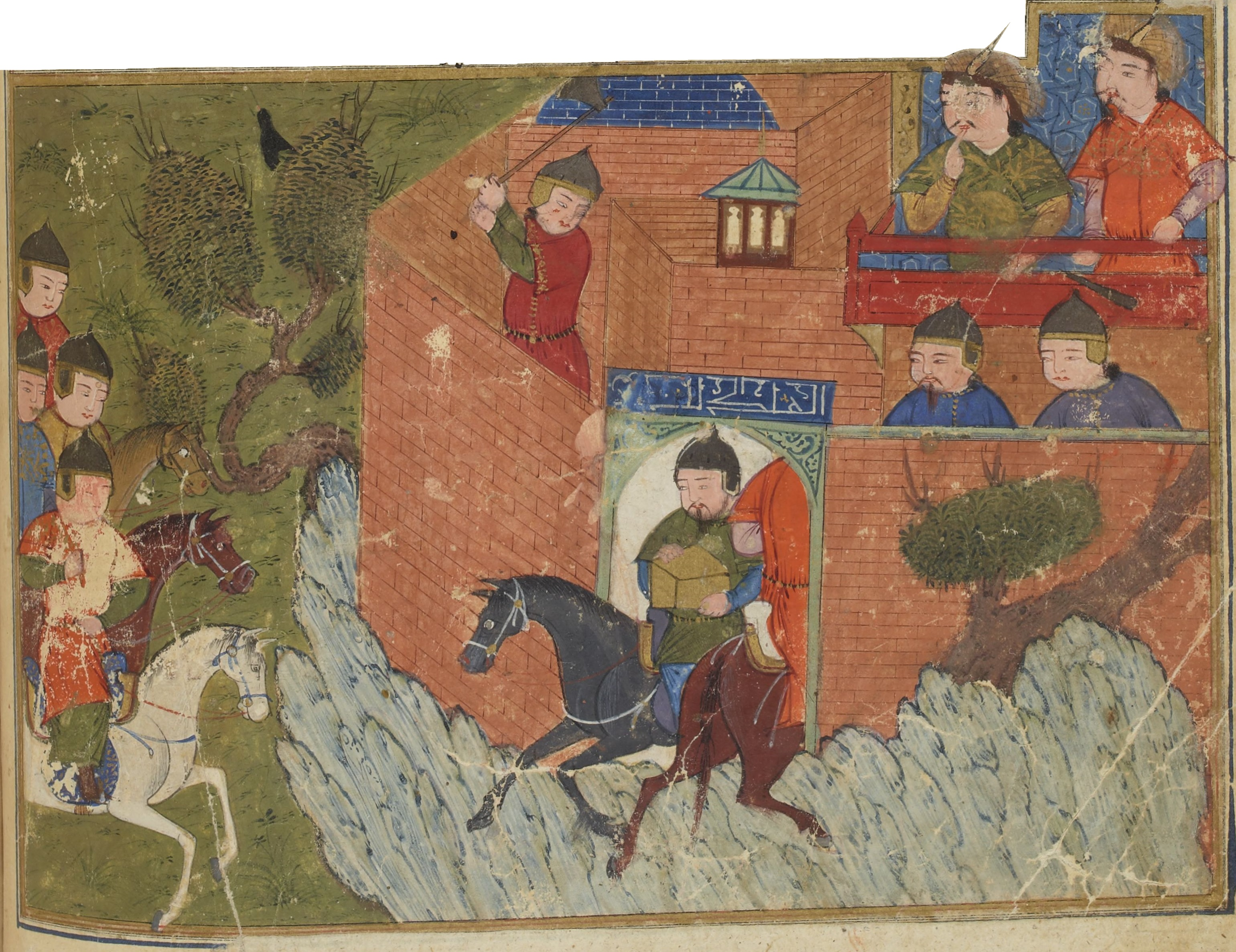
Siege of Alamut (1256) depicted in Jami' al-tawarikh by Rashid-al-Din Hamadani. Bibliothèque Nationale de France, Département des Manuscrits, Division Orientale.

From the 9th century onwards, Daylamite foot-soldiers began to comprise an important element of the armies in Iran. In the mid 9th century, the Abbasid Caliphate increased its need for mercenary soldiers in the Royal Guard and the army, thus they began recruiting Daylamites, who at the period were not as strong in numbers as the Turks, Khorasanis, the Farghanis, and the Egyptian tribesmen of the Maghariba. From 912/3 to 916/7, a Daylamite soldier, Ali ibn Wahsudhan, was chief of police (ṣāḥib al-shurṭa) in Isfahan during the reign of al-Muqtadir (r. 908–929). For many decades, "it remained customary for the Caliph's personal guards to include the Daylamites as well as the ubiquitous Turks". The Buyid amīrs, who were Daylamite themselves, supplemented their army of Daylamite infantrymen with Turkic cavalrymen. Daylamites were among the people comprising the Seljuq army, and Ghaznavids also employed them as elite infantry. Islamic sources record their characteristic painted shields and two-pronged short spears (in Persian: ژوپین zhūpīn; in Arabic: مزراق mizrāq) which could be used either for thrusting or for hurling as a javelin. Their characteristic battle tactic was advancing with a shield wall and using their spears and battle-axes from behind.

The Daylamite conquest of southern Iran, particularly the Fars and Kerman regions, took place between 934 and 936 under the leadership of Imad al-Dawla, also known as Ali ibn Buya, the eldest of the three brothers who founded the Buyid dynasty. Having taken full control of the Fars region with the fall of Shiraz, Ali tasked his brothers with conquering the other southern and western regions. One of the brothers, Ahmad, advanced westward to conquer Khuzestan, and then headed east to conquer the Kerman region. Through a major offensive during the Battle of Baghdad (946), the Buyids expelled the Hamdanids and secured control of the city. Consequently, the Daylamite expansion extended into Iraq as well. The enduring consolidation of the Buyids catalyzed a large-scale migration of Daylamite populations into newly annexed territories.

Daylamite military engagement stretched well into Mesopotamia, the Armenian Highlands and the periphery Anatolia. From the direction of Mesopotamia, following his complete seizure of control over Iraq in 977–978, Adud al-Dawla launched a major campaign toward Mosul and beyond. Having easily captured Mosul, Adud al-Dawla dispatched his army directly to the regions of Diyar Bakr. When Adud al-Dawla died in 983, he was a highly known ruler, directly controlling Iraq and parts of the Jazīra to the north of Iraq but was also in control of territories, directly or indirectly, from Khorasan to the Byzantine border of Syria, as well as from Oman to the shores of the Caspian. By the time the Buyid armies entered the regions, the Hamdanid resistance had already been broken. The fortresses and settlements around Diyar Bakr, most notably Mayyāfāriqīn, modern-day Silvan, the most fortified and strategic city in the region were swiftly captured by the Daylamite Buyid forces. Along the Southeastern Anatolia direction, the Daylamite expansion reached as far as the northern Diyar Bakr-Harpoot region.

The Daylamite Buyids also came into direct confrontation with the Byzantine Empire in southeastern Anatolia. During the Sallarid period, the Daylamites transcended the frontiers of Iran, reaching Azerbaijan, Armenia, Arran, Bagrevand and Vaspurakan, and subsequently penetrated deep into the Anatolian interior by eastern and northeastern directions. During this period, the Daylamites organized raids particularly targeting the areas in and in the vicinity of the Armenian Highlands, the Lake Van basin, Dvin, Kars, Ağrı and the Erzurum line. Thus, the Daylamite expansion reached Anatolia from the directions of Northeast and East Anatolia.

==== Legacy ====
During this expansion process, many Daylamite groups spread to newly conquered and reached territories. These Daylamite groups initially preserved their cultural identities and then gradually merged with the native populations. The Zazas, who call themselves Dimli (Dimla, Dilmi), are considered one of those Daylamite groups that spread to the West during the Daylamite expansion. The Zaza endonyms Dimli or Dimla are etymologically derived from the term Dailam, a linguistic theory was first documented by late-19th-century Armenian travelers and it was later introduced by Friedrich Carl Andreas in the early 1900s and subsequently endorsed by a broader consensus of scholars. This is corroborated by the presence of the Dailamites in Anatolia during various periods, the robust linguistic affinities between the Zaza language and regional languges spoken in Dailam and that Agathias in the 6th century describes the Dailamites (literally "Dilimnites") as "one of the largest nations on the other side of the Tigris, whose territory borders on Persia". This area is the present-day settlement area of the Dimli or Zaza. At the same time, modern research suggests that the Talysh have some cultural and linguistic connections with the historical Daylami people. In ancient times, the territory of the Talysh was called Dailam and it is possible that the Dailamites had a relationship with the Talysh. Comparative linguistic analysis demonstrates a high degree of congruence between Zaza and Talysh.

== Culture ==
=== Religion ===
The Daylamites were most likely adherents of some form of Iranian paganism, while a minority of them were Zoroastrian and Nestorian Christian. According to al-Biruni, the Daylamites and Gilites "lived by the rule laid down by the mythical Afridun." The Church of the East had spread among them due to the activities of John of Dailam, and bishoprics are reported in the remote area as late as the 790s, while it is possible that some remnants survived there until the 14th century.

=== Names ===
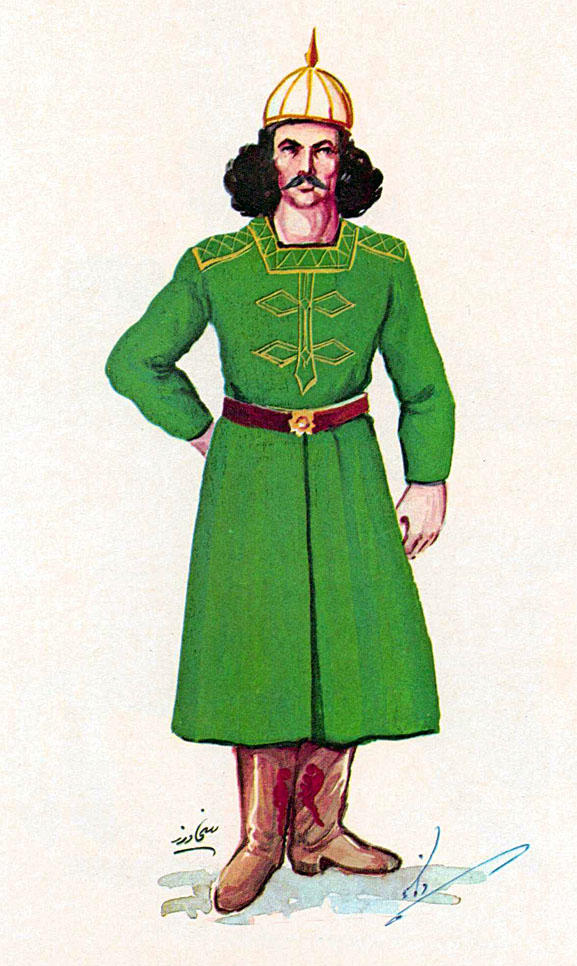
Artistic rendering of a Daylamite Buyid infantryman.

The name of the king Muta sounds uncommon, but when in the 9th and 10th centuries Daylamite chieftains appear in the spotlight in massive numbers, their names are undoubtedly pagan Iranian, not of the south-western "Persian" type, but of the north-western type: thus Gōrāngēj (not Kūrānkīj, as originally interpreted) corresponds to Persian gōr-angēz "chaser of wild asses", Shēr-zil to Shēr-dil "lion’s heart", etc. The medieval Persian geographer Estakhri differentiates between Persian and Daylami and comments that in the highlands of Daylam there was a tribe that spoke a language different from that of Daylam and Gilan, perhaps a surviving non-Iranian language.

=== Customs, equipment and appearance ===
Many habits and customs of the Daylamites have been recorded in historical records. Their men were strikingly tough and capable of lasting terrible privations. They were armed with javelins and battle axes, and had tall shields painted in gray colours. In battle, they would usually form a wall with their shields against the attackers. Some Daylamites would use javelins with burning naphtha. A poetic portrayal of Daylamite armed combat is present in Fakhruddin As'ad Gurgani's Vis and Rāmin. A major disadvantage of the Daylamites was the low amount of cavalry that they had, which compelled them to work with Turkic mercenaries.

The Daylamites exaggeratedly mourned over their dead, and even over themselves in failure. In 963, the Buyid ruler of Iraq, Mu'izz al-Dawla, popularized Mourning of Muharram in Baghdad, which may have played a part in the evolution of the ta'ziyeh.

Estakhri describes the Daylamites as a bold but inconsiderate people, being thin in appearance and having fluffy hair. They practised agriculture and had herds, but only a few horses. They also grew rice, fished, and produced silk textiles. According to al-Muqaddasi, the Daylamites were handsome and had beards. According to the author of the Hudud al-'Alam, the Daylamite women took part in agriculture like men. According to Rudhrawari, they were "equals of men in strength of mind, force of character, and participation in the management of affairs." Furthermore, the Daylamites also strictly practised endogamy.

== See also ==
- Rudkhan Castle
- Alamut Castle
- Lambsar Castle
- Fayruz Al Daylami
- Gilan province
- Al-Daylami

== Sources ==
- Amedroz, Henry F.; Margoliouth, David S., eds. (1921). The Eclipse of the 'Abbasid Caliphate. Original Chronicles of the Fourth Islamic Century, Vol. V: The concluding portion of The Experiences of Nations by Miskawaihi, Vol. II: Reigns of Muttaqi, Mustakfi, Muti and Ta'i. Oxford: Basil Blackwell.
- Bosworth, C. E. (1975). "Iran under the Buyids". In Frye, Richard N. (ed.). The Cambridge History of Iran: From the Arab Invasion to the Saljuqs. Vol. 4. Cambridge: Cambridge University Press. pp. 250–305. ISBN 0-521-20093-8.
- Bosworth, C. E. (1986). "ARMY ii. Islamic, to the Mongol period". In Yarshater, Ehsan (ed.). Encyclopædia Iranica. Vol. II/5: Armenia and Iran IV–Art in Iran I. London and New York: Routledge & Kegan Paul. pp. 499–503. ISBN 978-0-71009-105-5.
- Donohue, John J. (2003). The Buwayhid Dynasty in Iraq 334 H./945 to 403 H./1012: Shaping Institutions for the Future. Leiden and Boston: Brill. ISBN 90-04-12860-3.
- Kennedy, Hugh (2004) [1986]. The Prophet and the Age of the Caliphates: The Islamic Near East from the 6th to the 11th Century (Second ed.). Harlow: Longman. ISBN 978-0-582-40525-7.
- Kabir, Mafizullah (1964). The Buwayhid Dynasty of Baghdad, 334/946-447/1055.
- Kennedy, Hugh (2007). The Great Arab Conquests: How the Spread of Islam Changed the World We Live In. Philadelphia, Pennsylvania: Da Capo Press. ISBN 978-0-306-81740-3.
- Madelung, W. (1975). "The Minor Dynasties of Northern Iran". In Frye, Richard N. (ed.). The Cambridge History of Iran: From the Arab Invasion to the Saljuqs. Vol. 4. Cambridge: Cambridge University Press. pp. 198–249. ISBN 0-521-20093-8.
- Madelung, Wilferd; Felix, Wolfgang (1995). "Deylamites". In Yarshater, Ehsan (ed.). Encyclopædia Iranica. Vol. VII/4: Deylam, John of–Divorce IV. In modern Persia. London and New York: Routledge & Kegan Paul. pp. 342–347. ISBN 978-1-56859-022-6.
- Price, Massoume (2005). Iran's diverse peoples. ABC-CLIO. ISBN 978-1-57607-993-5.
- Minorsky, V. (1965). "Daylam". In Lewis, B.; Pellat, Ch. & Schacht, J. (eds.). The Encyclopaedia of Islam, Second Edition. Volume II: C–G. Leiden: E. J. Brill. OCLC 495469475.
- Nagel, Tilman (1990). "Buyids". In Yarshater, Ehsan (ed.). Encyclopædia Iranica. Vol. IV/6: Burial II–Calendars II. London and New York: Routledge & Kegan Paul. pp. 578–586. ISBN 978-0-71009-129-1.
- Potts, Daniel T. (2014). Nomadism in Iran: From Antiquity to the Modern Era. London and New York: Oxford University Press. pp. 1–558. ISBN 9780199330799.
- Al-Tabari, Abu Ja'far Muhammad ibn Jarir (1985–2007). Ehsan Yar-Shater (ed.). The History of Al-Ṭabarī. Vol. 40 vols. Albany, NY: State University of New York Press.
- Potts, Daniel T. (2012). "ARABIA ii. The Sasanians and Arabia". In Yarshater, Ehsan (ed.). Encyclopædia Iranica (Online ed.). Encyclopædia Iranica Foundation.
- Zakeri, Mohsen (1995). Sāsānid Soldiers in Early Muslim Society: The Origins of ʿAyyārān and Futuwwa. Wiesbaden: Otto Harrassowitz. ISBN 978-3-447-03652-8.
