= House of Karen =

One of the Seven Great Houses of Iran

- Parent house: Arsacids
- Country: Parthian Empire, Sasanian Empire
- Current head: None, extinct
- Members: Sukhra, Karin, Alanda
- Estate: Nahavand
- Cadet branches: Kamsarakan; Qarinvands; Masmughans of Damavand

The House of Karen (Parthian: 𐭊𐭓𐭍𐭉, romanized: Kārēn; Middle Persian: Kārēn; New Persian: قارن, romanized: Qāran, or کارن, Kāran), also known as Karen-Pahlav (Kārēn-Pahlaw), was one of the Seven Great Houses of Iran during the rule of Parthian and Sasanian Empires. The seat of the dynasty was at Nahavand, about 65 km south of Ecbatana (present-day Hamadan, Iran). Members of the House of Karen were of notable rank in the administrative structure of the Sassanian empire in multiple periods of its four-century-long history.

== Origin and history ==
The Karens, Karan-Vands, Qarinvand dynasty or Karen-Pahlevi, as they are also called, claimed descent from Karen, a figure of folklore and son of the equally mythical Kaveh the Blacksmith. Their historical origin, however, may be that the Karens, along with the House of Mihran, were descended from the Arsacids. According to Movses Khorenatsi, this descent was via one of the three sons of Phraates IV, also named Karen. The fact that Karen may also have been among the family names of the Arsacid dynasty may give credence to this theory.

The name Karen might also be found earlier in Iranian history. A possible early member of the family was a certain Vishtaspa krny (krny being a variation of Karen) who lived in Bactria during the later Achaemenid period. This figure has been identified with Hystaspes, a member of the Achaemenid royal family who fought under Darius III during Alexander the Great's invasion of Persia. Hystaspes' wife, a granddaughter of Artaxerxes III, fell into Macedonian hands following the Battle of Gaugamela. However, he was reunited with her and raised to a high position under Alexander's command. However, it has been argued that 'Vishtaspa krny' should rather be translated 'Hystaspes the karanos', since krny is attested in later sources as the Aramaic version of a Persian word meaning 'army leader', called karanos in Greek sources; this would mean that Vishtaspa was not a member of the House of Karen at all.

However, the first verified reference to the Karenas was during the Arsacid Empire, specifically as one of the feudal houses affiliated with the Parthian court. They were similar to the House of Suren, the only other attested feudal house of the Parthian period. Following the conquest of the Parthians, the Karenas allied themselves with the Sassanids, at whose court they were identified as one of the so-called "Parthian clans". The Armenian Kamsarakan family was a branch of the House of Karen.

Following the defeat of the Sasanians by the army of Rashidun at the Battle of Badghis, the Karenas pledged allegiance to the Caliphate. In 783, however, under Vandad Hormozd and allied with the Bavands, the Karenas proclaimed independence and refused to continue to pay tribute. Notwithstanding repeated (and some temporarily successful) attempts to conquer the Karenas, during which the family had withdrawn further eastwards to the Savadkuh region, some of the lands of the Karenas appear to have remained independent until the 11th century, after which the House of Karen is no longer attested. Other notable members of the family include Maziar, the grandson of Vandad Hormozd, whose devotion to Zoroastrianism and defiance of the Arabs brought him great fame.

== Karen Spahbeds ==
- Sukhra (r. 525–550)
- Karin (r. 550–600)
- Alanda (r. 600–635)
- Valash (r. 650–673)
- Several Karen princes (r. 673–765)
- Vandad Hormozd (r. 765–815)
- Vandad Safan (r. 765–800)
- Karin ibn Vandad Hormozd (r. 815–816)
- Mazyar (r. 817)
- Vinda-Umid (r. 800–820)
- Bavand rule (r. 817)
- Quhyar (r. 817–823)
- Mazyar (r. 823-839/840)
- Quhyar (r. 839)

== See also ==
- Seven Parthian clans

== Sources ==
- Schindel, Nikolaus (2013). "KAWĀD I i. Reign". Encyclopaedia Iranica, Vol. XVI, Fasc. 2. pp. 136–141.
- Pourshariati, Parvaneh (2008). Decline and Fall of the Sasanian Empire: The Sasanian-Parthian Confederacy and the Arab Conquest of Iran. London and New York: I.B. Tauris. ISBN 978-1-84511-645-3.
- Al-Tabari, Abu Ja'far Muhammad ibn Jarir (1985–2007). Ehsan Yar-Shater (ed.). The History of Al-Ṭabarī. Vol. 40 vols. Albany, NY: State University of New York Press.
- Toumanoff, C. (2010). "KAMSARAKAN". Encyclopaedia Iranica, Vol. XV, Fasc. 5. pp. 453–455.
- Bosworth, C. E. (1968). "The Political and Dynastic History of the Iranian World (A.D. 1000–1217)". In Frye, R. N. (ed.). The Cambridge History of Iran, Volume 5: The Saljuq and Mongol periods. Cambridge: Cambridge University Press. pp. 1–202. ISBN 0-521-06936-X.
- Frye, R. N. (1986). "Bāwand". The Encyclopedia of Islam, New Edition, Volume I: A–B. Leiden and New York: BRILL. p. 1110. ISBN 90-04-08114-3.
- Madelung, W. (1975). "The Minor Dynasties of Northern Iran". In Frye, R. N. (ed.). The Cambridge History of Iran, Volume 4: From the Arab Invasion to the Saljuqs. Cambridge: Cambridge University Press. pp. 198–249. ISBN 978-0-521-20093-6.
- Madelung, W. (1984). "ĀL-E BĀVAND (BAVANDIDS)". Encyclopaedia Iranica, Vol. I, Fasc. 7. London u.a.: Routledge & Kegan Paul. pp. 747–753. ISBN 90-04-08114-3.
- Rekaya, M. (1997). "Ḳārinids". The Encyclopedia of Islam, New Edition, Volume IV: Iran–Kha. Leiden and New York: BRILL. pp. 644–647. ISBN 90-04-05745-5.
- Mottahedeh, Roy (1975). "The ʿAbbāsid Caliphate in Iran". In Frye, R. N. (ed.). The Cambridge History of Iran, Volume 4: From the Arab Invasion to the Saljuqs. Cambridge: Cambridge University Press. pp. 57–90. ISBN 978-0-521-20093-6.
- Ibn Isfandiyar, Muhammad ibn al-Hasan (1905). An Abridged Translation of the History of Tabaristan, Compiled About A.H. 613 (A.D. 1216). Trans. Edward G. Browne. Leyden: E.J. Brill.
- Pourshariati, Parvaneh (2017). "KĀRIN". Encyclopaedia Iranica.
- Herzfeld, Ernst (1928). "The Hoard of the Kâren Pahlavs". The Burlington Magazine for Connoisseurs. 52 (298). Journal of Near Eastern Studies, vol. 52, no. 298: 21–27. JSTOR 863510.
