= Ruyan, Iran =

City in Mazandaran province, Iran

Ruyan Persian: رويان
- City
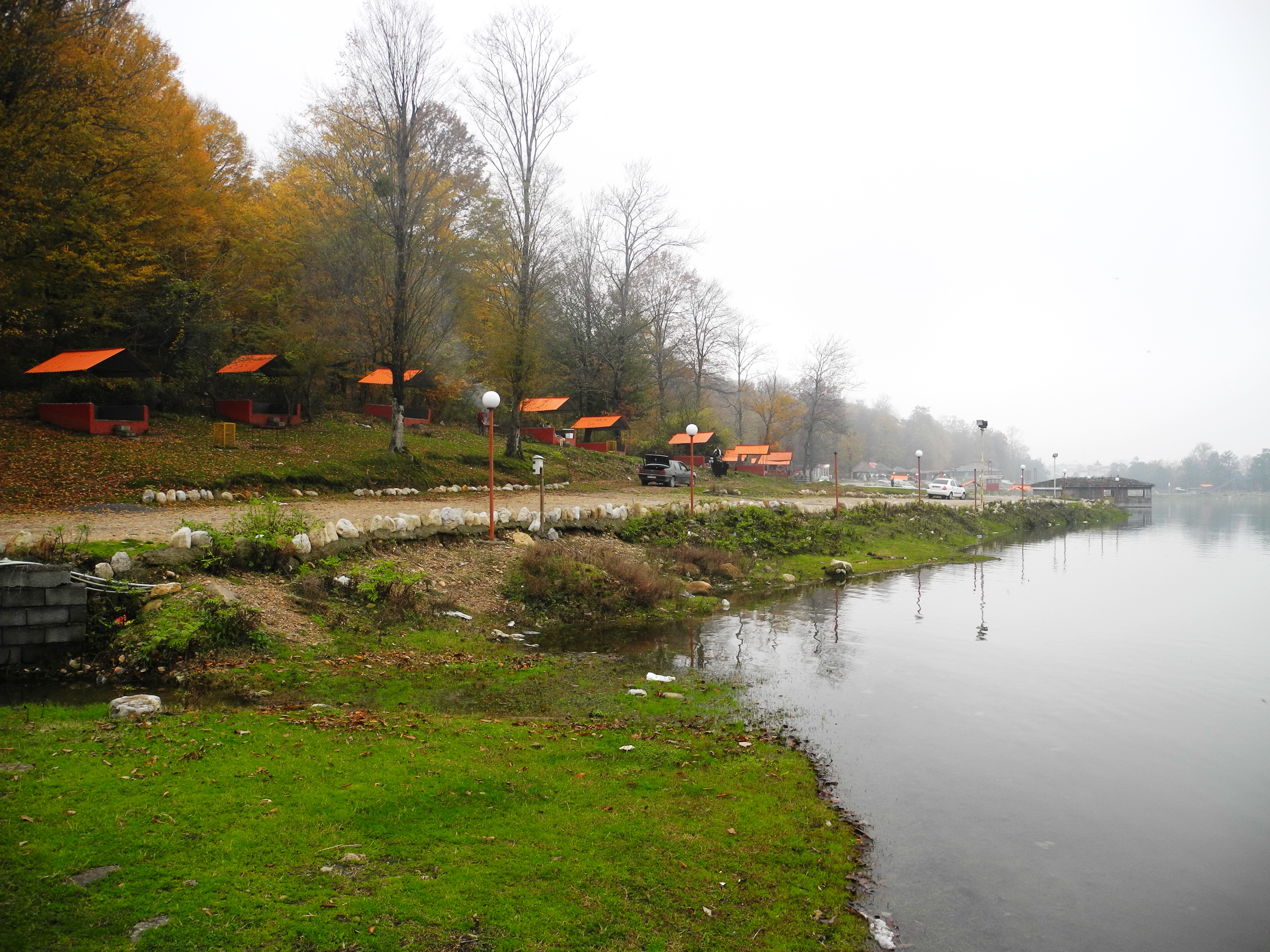
- Tomb of Jamshid Kia Soltan, Ruyan

- Location within Iran
- Coordinates: 36°34′08″N 51°57′40″E
- Country: Iran
- Province: Mazandaran
- County: Nur
- District: Central
- Elevation: −12 m (−39 ft)

Population (2016)
  - Total: 7,731
- Time zone: UTC+3:30 (IRST)

Ruyan (Persian: رويان) (Note: Also known as Royan; formerly known as ‘Alamdeh) is a city in the Central District of Nur County, Mazandaran province, Iran.

== Demographics ==
=== Population ===
At the time of the 2006 National Census, the city's population was 6,339 in 1,708 households. The following census in 2011 counted 7,102 people in 2,081 households. The 2016 census measured the population of the city as 7,731 people in 2,461 households.

== See also ==
- Alam-Kuh
- Alamut

Media related to Royan, Iran at Wikimedia Commons
