= Daylami language =

Extinct Iranian language of northern Iran

Daylami
- Daylamite, Deylami, Dailamite, Deilami
- ديلمی
- Native to: Iran
- Region: South Caspian Sea, Daylam
- Ethnicity: Daylamites
- Era: 900–1300 AD
- Language family: Indo-European: Indo-Iranian; Iranian; Western Iranian; Northwestern; Daylami
- Dialects: Tatoid dialects?
- Writing system: Persian alphabet

Language codes
- ISO 639-3: None (mis)
- Glottolog: None

Daylami, also known as Daylamite, Deilami, Dailamite, or Deylami (Persian: دیلمی, from the name of the Daylam region), is an extinct language that was one of the northwestern branch of the Iranian languages. It was spoken in northern Iran, specifically in the mountainous area in Gīlān. The Atlas of the Languages of Iran states that the term "Deylami" is most closely associated with the South Alborz varieties spoken in the historical region of Daylam. However it is also sometimes applied to Galeshi and, by extension, Eastern Gilaki as a whole. This implies that contemporary South Alborz varieties might be direct descendants or especially close relatives of medieval Daylami.

Parviz Natel Khanlari listed the language as one of Iranian dialects spoken between the 9th and 13th centuries. Istakhri, a medieval Iranian geographer, has written about the language, as did Al-Muqaddasi, a medieval Arab geographer, who wrote "they have an obscure language and they use the phoneme khe /x/ a lot." Abū Esḥāq Ṣābī had a similar report on people in the Deylam highlands who spoke a distinct language.

According to Wilfered Madelung, in the early Islamic period the language of the Deylamites was a northwestern Iranian language. One of the characteristics of the language was an added ī sound between consonants and ā (Lāhījān=Līāhījān, Amīrkā=Amīrkīā).
