= Shapur (Bavandid ruler) =

Ruler of the Bavand dynasty in 825

Shapur (Persian: شاپور یکم) was the seventh ruler of the Bavand dynasty, who ruled briefly in 825. He was the son and successor of Shahriyar I.

== Reign ==
Just when Shapur had ascended the Bavandid throne, the Qarinvand Mazyar, whom Shapur's father Shahriyar I along with Mazyar's uncle Vinda-Umid had expelled from Tabaristan, returned with an Abbasid army, and invaded the territories of Shapur and Vinda-Umid, where he defeated them both. Vinda-Umid was killed, whilst Shapur was taken hostage.

Shapur, knowing that Mazyar planned to have him killed, sent a secret message to the Abbasid governor of Tabaristan, Musa ibn Hafs, willing to pay him 100,000 dirhams if he would assert him as his own prisoner. Musa responded by saying his best chance would be by converting to Islam and become a client of the caliph. Musa, nervous of Mazyar learning of his secret communication with Shapur, asked him how he would react if Shapur converted to Islam and offered to become a client of the caliph. Mazyar gave no answer, but had Shapur beheaded the same day, which greatly angered Musa.

== Sources ==
- Madelung, W. (1975). "The Minor Dynasties of Northern Iran". In Frye, R.N. (ed.). The Cambridge History of Iran, Volume 4: From the Arab Invasion to the Saljuqs. Cambridge: Cambridge University Press. pp. 198–249. ISBN 978-0-521-20093-6.
- Ibn Isfandiyar, Muhammad ibn al-Hasan (1905). An Abridged Translation of the History of Tabaristan, Compiled About A.H. 613 (A.D. 1216). Translated by Edward G. Browne. Leyden: E.J. Brill.

Regnal titles
Preceded by Shahriyar I	Bavandid ruler ca. 825	Succeeded by Mazyar
