= Shahriyar I =

Ruler of the Bavand dynasty from 817 to 825

Shahriyar I (Persian: شهریار) was the sixth ruler of the Bavand dynasty from 817 to 825. He was the grandson and successor of Sharwin I. Before Shahriyar became ruler of the Bavand dynasty, he was taken as hostage by Harun al-Rashid to Baghdad, where Shahriyar stayed for four years until he was allowed to return to Tabaristan.

In 817, Sharwin I died, and Shahriyar succeeded him. After Shahriyar's coronation, the Abbasid caliph al-Ma'mun, sent him robes of honour, and requested his and the Qarinvand ruler Qarin ibn Vindadhhurmuzd's aid in the Arab–Byzantine wars. Shahriyar declined the request, while Qarin accepted, and became successful in his campaign against the Byzantines. Qarin was then bestowed with many honors by Al-Ma'mun. Shahriyar, jealous of Qarin's fame, began annexing some of the latter's territory. In 817, during the reign of Qarin's son Mazyar, Shahriyar, with the aid of Mazyar's uncle Vinda-Umid, expelled the latter from Tabaristan, and seized all his territories. Shahriyar later died in 825, and was succeeded by his son Shapur.

Preceded by Sharwin I	Bavand ruler 817–825	Succeeded by Shapur
