= Zarmihrids =

Dynasty of Tabaristan

The Zarmihrid dynasty was a local dynasty of Tabaristan which ruled over parts of the mountainous areas of the region, from the reign of Sasanian king Khosrau I to 785.

The family claimed its origin from a powerful Karen lord named Sukhra, a descendant of Kaveh the blacksmith, the national hero of Iran, and who was one of the leading nobles of the empire during the reign of Balash and Kavadh I. According to a traditional story, Sukhra left two children, Karin and Zarmihr, who helped Khosrau I protect the eastern borders of his empire when it was invaded by Turkic nomads. Karin was rewarded with land in the south of Amol, and was given title of Ispahbadh, thus starting the Karen dynasty of Tabaristan. Zarmihr was rewarded with parts of Tabaristan and was given the title of Marzban and Masmughan. Eastern Tabaristan was mainly divided between the Karenids, the Zarmihrids and the Marzban of Tomisha.

In 783, the Karenids, along with the Bavandids and the Zarmihrids revolted against the Abbasid Caliphate, the alliance was, however, defeated in 785, and thus the Zarmihrids disappeared from history afterwards.

== See also ==
- Dabuyid dynasty
- Seven Parthian clans

== Sources ==
- Rabino de Borgomale, Les dynasties du Mazanderan, Londres, 1928
