= Roy Mottahedeh =

American historian (1940–2024)

Roy Parviz Mottahedeh (July 3, 1940 – July 30, 2024) was an American historian who was Gurney Professor of History, emeritus at Harvard University, where he taught courses on the pre-modern social and intellectual history of the Islamic Middle East and was an expert on Iranian culture. Mottahedeh served as the director of Harvard's Center for Middle Eastern Studies from 1987 to 1990, and as the inaugural director of the Prince Alwaleed Bin Talal Islamic Studies Program at Harvard University from 2006 to 2011.

== Early life and education ==
Roy Parviz Mottahedeh was born in New York City on July 3, 1940. His parents were Rafi Y. and Mildred Mottahedeh. He received his primary and secondary education in Quaker schools in New York and Pennsylvania. In 1960 he graduated magna cum laude in history from Harvard College and was awarded a Shaw Traveling Fellowship, which he used to explore Europe, the Middle East and Afghanistan. He then undertook a second B.A. in Persian and Arabic at the University of Cambridge in the UK, where he received the E. G. Browne Prize. In 1962 he returned to Harvard for doctoral studies in history, where he studied with Sir Hamilton Gibb and Richard Frye. He was elected a Junior Fellow in the Harvard Society of Fellows and received his PhD in 1970 for a dissertation on Buyid administration.

== Career and research ==
Mottahedeh began his teaching career at Princeton University in 1970. A Guggenheim Fellowship allowed him to write his first book, Loyalty and Leadership in an Early Islamic Society (1980), the manuscript of which gained him tenure. He was one of the first group of MacArthur fellows in 1981. The MacArthur award allowed him to write his second book, The Mantle of the Prophet (1985), which was a study of contemporary Iran as understood through two millennia of history. This book has been widely translated and remains in print.

In 1986 Mottahedeh returned to Harvard University as professor of Islamic history in the History Department. He served as the director of the Center for Middle Eastern Studies at Harvard University from 1987 to 1990 and founded the Harvard Middle East and Islamic Review as a medium for Harvard students and teachers to publish their work. He was elected a member of the American Academy of Arts and Sciences and the Council on Foreign Relations and has served as a series editor for several academic publishers. In 1994 he was appointed Gurney Professor of History. Together with Angeliki Laiou he co-edited The Crusades from the Perspective of Byzantium and the Muslim World (2001). His book, Lessons in Islamic Jurisprudence, a translation of Muhammad Baqir al-Sadr's Durus fi 'ilm al 'usul with an introduction, published in 2005, studies the philosophy of Islamic law as taught in Shiʻite seminaries. Together with David Durand-Guedy and Juergen Paul, he co-edited Cities of Medieval Iran in Eurasian Studies 16 in 2018, which was reprinted separately in 2020. Mottahedeh received an honorary degree from the University of Lund, Sweden, in 2006.

Mottahedeh was the author of numerous articles on a wide range of topics from the Abbasid period in the eighth century to Islamic revival movements of the present day. One of his most widely distributed articles, which has been translated into many languages, was his critique of Huntington's theory of the clash of civilizations. His other publications consider topics including the transmission of learning in the Muslim world, the social bonds that connected people in the early Islamic Middle East, the theme of "wonders" in The Thousand and One Nights, the concept of jihad in the early Islamic period, and perceptions of Persepolis among later Muslims. His collected essays, In the Shadow of the Prophet: Essays in Islamic History, were published in 2023.

== Awards ==
- 1981 MacArthur Fellowship

== Works ==
- Loyalty and Leadership in an Early Islamic Society. I.B.Tauris. 2001. ISBN 978-1-86064-181-7. (2nd edition)
- The Mantle of the Prophet: Religion and Politics in Iran. Oneworld. 2000. ISBN 978-1-85168-234-8.
- Angeliki E. Laiou; Roy P. Mottahedeh, eds. (2001). "The Idea of Jihad in Islam before the Crusades". The Crusades from the perspective of Byzantium and the Muslim world. Dumbarton Oaks. ISBN 978-0-88402-277-0.
- Lessons in Islamic Jurisprudence. Oneworld Publications. 2005. ISBN 978-1-85168-393-2.: a translation of Muhammad Baqir as-Sadr, Durus fi Ilm al-Usul
- Zulfikar Hirji, ed. (2010). "Pluralism and Islamic Traditions of Sectarian Divisions". Pluralism and Diversity in Islam. I.B. Tauris.
- Farhad Daftary; Elizabeth Fernea; Azim Nanji, eds. (2010). "Faith and Practice: Muslims in Historic Cairo". Living in Historic Cairo: Past and Present in an Islamic City. University of Washington Press.
- Edmund Herzig; Sarah Stewart, eds. (2012). "The Idea of Iran in the Buyid Dominions". Early Islamic Iran. I.B. Tauris.
- Kazuo Morimoto, ed. (2012). "Quranic Commentary on the Verse of Khums (al-Anfal VIII:41)". Sayyids and Sharifs in Muslim Societies: the Living Links to the Prophet. Routledge.

== Death ==
Mottahedeh died on July 30, 2024. He was 84
