= Daylam =

Historical mountainous region of northern Iran

Coordinates: 36.8889°N 49.9056°E

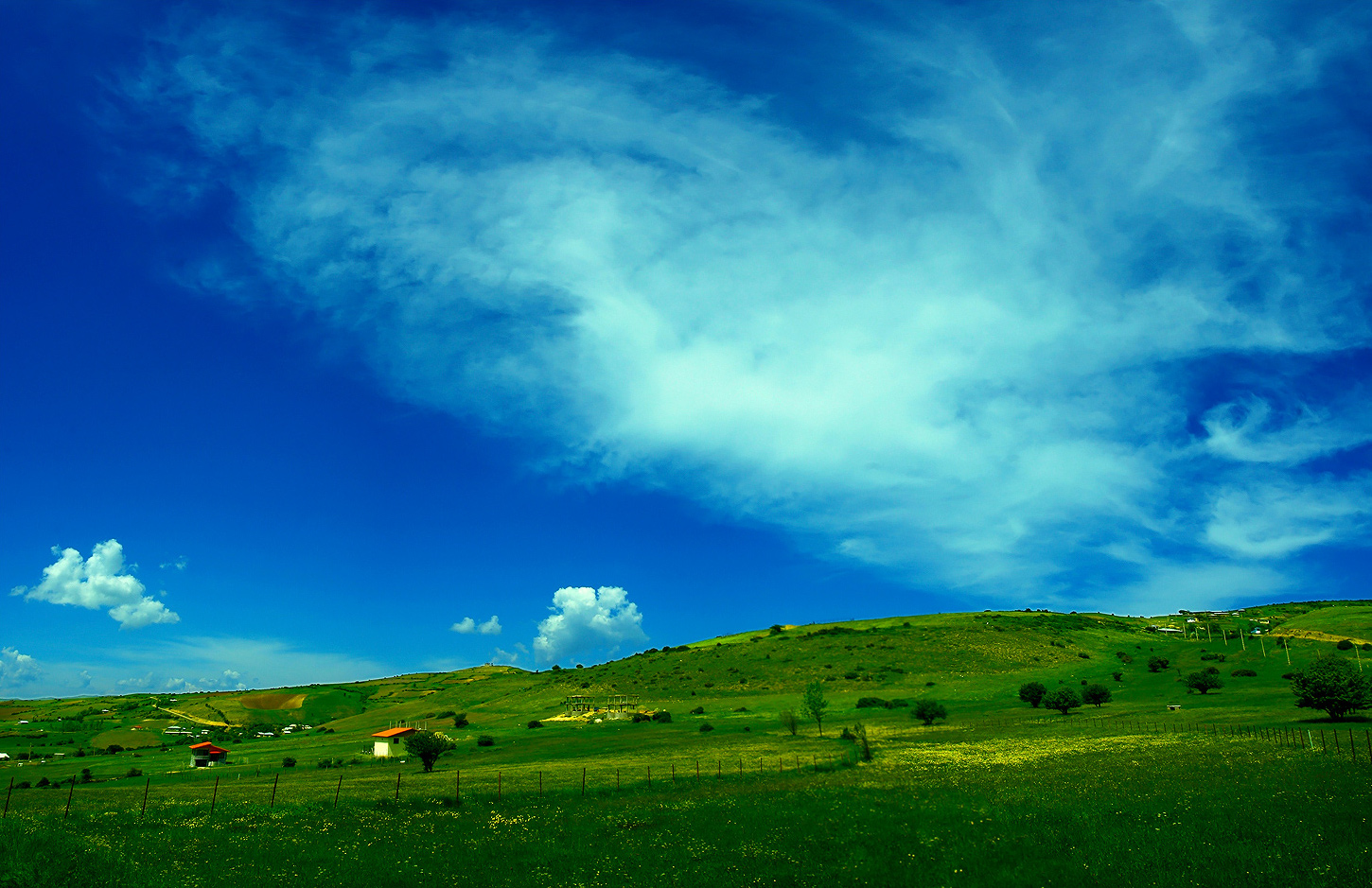
Nature of Deylaman

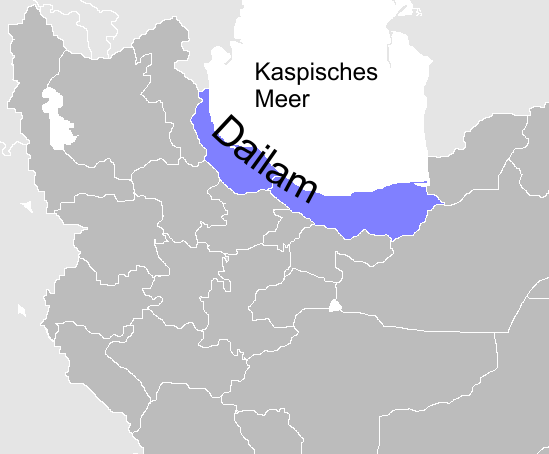
The historical region of Dailam on the Caspian Sea. The present-day Iranian provinces of Gilan (left) and Mazandaran (right) are highlighted in color.

Daylam (Persian: دیلم), also known in the plural form Daylaman (دیلمان) (and variants such as Dailam, Deylam, and Deilam), was the name of a mountainous region of inland Gilan, Iran. It was so named for its inhabitants, known as the Daylamites.

The Church of the East established a metropolitan diocese for Daylam and Gilan around 790 under Shubhalisho.

== See also ==
- Buyid dynasty
- Daylami language
- Talysh people
- al-Daylami
- Zaydiyyah
- Nizari Ismaili state

== Bibliography ==
- Amedroz, Henry F.; Margoliouth, David S., eds. (1921). The Eclipse of the 'Abbasid Caliphate. Original Chronicles of the Fourth Islamic Century, Vol. V: The concluding portion of The Experiences of Nations by Miskawaihi, Vol. II: Reigns of Muttaqi, Mustakfi, Muti and Ta'i. Oxford: Basil Blackwell.
