= Sabzevar University of New Technology =

University in Sabzevar, Iran

Coordinates: 36°17′54″N 57°40′51″E

- دانشگاه فناوری های نوین سبزوار
- Type: Public
- Established: 2011
- Academic staff: 15
- Location: Sabzevar, Khorasan Razavi, Iran

The Sabzevar University of New Technology (SUNT) is a public university in Sabzevar city at Razavi Khorasan province of Iran. Founded in 2011 in response to the increasing industrialization of Iran, SUNT adopted an industrial university model and stressed laboratory instruction in applied science and engineering. The university is a young one, with a campus that extends more than a mile alongside Sabzevar-Mashhad road. According to Ministry of Science, Research and Technology. SUNT offers 6 bachelor programs for more than 1000 students.

== Departments ==
- Engineering Department

== Courses ==
- Industrial Engineer
- Information Technology Engineer
- Math Engineer
- Physics Engineer

== Former Chancellors ==
- Prof. Javad Haddadnia (2011-2013)
- Dr. Hosein Jalilvand (2013-2015)
- Prof. Javad Haddadnia (2015-2016)
- Dr. Abolghasem Amirahmadi (2016- )

== See also ==
- Hakim Sabzevari University
- Sabzevar University of Medical Sciences
- Islamic Azad University of Sabzevar
