= Lutf Allah (Sarbadar) =

- King
- Reign: 1347-1348 (First), 1360-1361 (Second)
- Predecessor: Kulū Isfandiyār (First), Haidar Qassāb (Second)
- Successor: Khwaja Shams al-Din 'Ali (First), Hasan Damghani (Second)
- Died: 1361
- Dynasty: Sarbadars
- Father: Wajih ad-Din Mas'ud
- Religion: Shia Islam

Lutf Allah (d. c. 1357/58) was the leader of the Sarbadars of Sabzewar from 1356 until his death.

== Life ==
Lutf Allah was the son of Wajih ad-Din Mas'ud, the second leader of the Sarbadars, and was considered by Mas'ud's adherents to be his legitimate successor. By the reign of Yahya Karawi he had come of age and Mas'ud's supporters were ready to install him as head of state. After the murder of Yahya in c. 1355 they attempted to seize control of the government. They were prevented from doing so by Haidar Qassāb, who drove them from Sabzewar and killed many of them. The remaining members of Mas'ud's party fled to Esfarayen, where Lutf Allah's atabeg Nasr Allah rebelled against the central government. The situation for Lutf Allah improved when Haidar Qassib was murdered on the orders of Hasan Damghani. Hasan then had Lutf Allah proclaimed as formal sovereign of the Sarbadars.

Lutf Allah's reign was short and consisted mostly of him acting as a figurehead for Hasan Damghani. During this time Astarabad was lost to Amir Vali. After a few years Lutf Allah got into a disagreement with Hasan Damghani, who deposed and executed him and then took formal control of the state. With Lutf Allah's death the party of Mas'ud was mostly broken.

== Notes ==
Preceded by Kulū Isfandiyār	Head of the Sarbadars (First reign); 1356–c. 1347-1348	Succeeded by Khwaja Shams al-Din 'Ali

Preceded by Haidar Qassāb	Head of the Sarbadars (Second reign); 1356–c. 1360-1361	Succeeded by Hasan Damghani
