= Karawi =

Karawi is an Arabic surname. Notable people with the surname include:

- Yahya Karawi (died 1355/56), leader of the Sarbadars of Sabzewar from around 1351 until his death
- Zahir al-Din Karawi, leader of the Sarbadars of Sabzewar for a part of 1355/56
