= Haidar Qassāb =

Haidar Qassab
- King
- Reign: 1356-1356
- Predecessor: Zahir al-Din Karawi
- Successor: Lutf Allah
- Died: 1356
- Dynasty: Sarbadars
- Religion: Shia Islam

Haidar Qassāb (died 1356) was the head of the Sarbadars of Sabzewar During 1356.

== Biography ==
A possible member of the artisan guild, Haidar Qassāb served in the government of Khwaja Shams al-Din 'Ali as a collector of urban craft and trade taxes. When the accounts for the revenues generated by these taxes fell into arrears, Haidar was harshly punished by Shams al-Din 'Ali. In retaliation, Haidar had him assassinated in 1351 or 1352. Yahya Karawi, an aristocrat who had been informed by Haidar of the assassination plot, succeeded Shams al-Din 'Ali as head of state. Under him Haidar served in a military post and commanded the army forces in Astarabad after it was conquered in 1353/54.

When Yahya was murdered in 1355 or 1356, several members of the party of Wajih ad-Din Mas'ud attempted to install Mas'ud's son Lutf Allah as ruler. Haidar Qassāb prevented this by marching from Astarabad to Sabzewar and forcing the conspirators to flee the city. When they sought refuge in a castle, he had it razed to the ground. After this he installed Yahya's nephew Zahir al-Din Karawi as head of state.

Zahir al-Din quickly proved to be an unsatisfactory ruler for Haidar Qassib. Some of Mas'ud's followers had escaped Haidar's purge, and Luft Allah's atabeg Nasr Allah rebelled in Esfarayen. Ignoring Haidar's advice, Zahir al-Din refused to move against the rebels. Haidar then deposed him and took formal control of the government himself. His position was very weak, however; both the partisans of Mas'ud (who disliked him for his original affiliation with Shams al-Din 'Ali and his crackdown on Lutf Allah's supporters) and the dervishes (who hated him due to his murder of Shams al-Din 'Ali) were opposed to him. Before he and his army could reach Esfarayen to subdue the rebels, he was stabbed to death by the Turkish slave of Hasan Damghani in 1356. Hasan Damghani then installed Lutf Allah as head of the Sarbadars.

== Notes ==
Preceded by Zahir al-Din Karawi	Head of the Sarbadars; 1355/6–1356	Succeeded by Lutf Allah
