= Shams al-Din ibn Fazl Allah =

Ruler of the Sarbadars from 1347 to 1348

Shams Al-Din ibn Fazl Allah
- King
- Reign: 1347-1348
- Predecessor: Kulū Isfandiyār
- Successor: Khwaja Shams al-Din 'Ali
- Dynasty: Sarbadars
- Father: Fazl Allah
- Religion: Shia Islam

Shams al-Din was the leader of the Sarbadars of Sabzewar from 1347 until around 1348.

== Reign ==
Shams al-Din was the son of Fazl Allah and the brother of 'Abd al-Razzaq and Wajih ad-Din Mas'ud. As such, he had significant support amongst the members of the Bashtini gentry and the military. In 1347 they moved against Kulu Isfandiyar, who at that time controlled Sabzewar, and overthrew him. Shams al-Din then took control of the government. He was only able to hold on to power for about a year. A failure to pay the troops resulted in him in losing the favor of the military, and eventually he had so few supporters that the pro-dervish aristocrat Khwaja Shams al-Din 'Ali was able to stage a coup and force him to abdicate in 1348.

Preceded by Kulu Isfandiyar	Head of the Sarbadars; 1347–1348	Succeeded by Khwaja Shams al-Din 'Ali
