= Zahir al-Din Karawi =

- King
- Reign: 1356-1359
- Predecessor: Yahya Karawi
- Successor: Haidar Qassāb
- Dynasty: Sarbadars
- Religion: Shia Islam

Zahir al-Din Karawi was the leader of the Sarbadars of Sabzewar from 1356 to 1359.

== Reign ==
Zahir al-Din was the nephew of Yahya Karawi. After his uncle's murder in 1355 or 1356, the partisans of Wajih ad-Din Mas'ud attempted to take control of the government and install Mas'ud's son Lutf Allah as head of state. They were, however, dispersed by Haidar Qassib, who then declared Zahir al-Din as ruler.

In the meantime, some of Lutf Allah's supporters had escaped from Sabzewar. Lutf Allah's atabeg Nasr Allah soon rebelled in Esfarayen. Haidar Qassib encouraged Zahir al-Din to move against the rebels but his advice was ignored. He then deposed Zahir al-Din and took control of Sabzewar himself.

Preceded by Yahya Karawi	Head of the Sarbadars; 1355/6	Succeeded by Haidar Qassib
