= DJ Fasanghari =

Iranian disc jockey

DJ Fasnaghari
- Born: Hossein Fasnaghari; 28 November 1982 (age 43); Sabzevar, Iran
- Occupations: Electronic musician, DJ, Internet meme
- Years active: 2000–present

DJ Fasnaghari is the subject of an Internet meme that quickly became popular among the Iranian Internet user community in 2014. The release of several clips of a DJ named Fasnaghari singing, playing the keyboard, and warming up at a wedding and broadcasting them on social media made him an "internet figure" in a short period of time, in one or two films or serials of the Iranian Radio and Television. Attend, talk to a TV show about happiness and a foreign media outlet about the large number of his fans on the Internet, and release animations and games centered on him for the Android operating system. Had visitors. One of these pages received 100,000 likes in two weeks and his clips were viewed over 60,000 times. This was one of the first times that the potential of social networks such as Facebook appeared in Iran.

== Early life ==
Hossein Fasnaghari was born in 1982 in Sabzevar and graduated from Sabzevar University with a bachelor's degree in civil engineering. After becoming famous on the Internet, Fosnaghari starred in Reza Sobhani's film Torpedo. He was also an actor in the TV series Old Road, whose sequences were censored. Running a program in a psychiatric hospital and trying to make happy the "most vulnerable patients" who have "social problems and injuries" and find it harder to make them happy took the first step towards social activities.

Saman Ali Nejadian wrote in the weekly Ava Khuzestan that Fasnaghari was a well-known person in his hometown, but criticism caused him to be isolated. Fasnqari's programs, he said, he receives a salary of four million tomans for performing at weddings in Tehran.

== Reactions ==
Reactions to the cyber-incident were varied, with some praising Fasnaghari and others mocking, insulting and sharply criticizing him.

Bozorgmehr Hosseinpour, a cartoonist and satirist, believes that the characteristic of Fasnaghari is satisfaction and being happy in the moment. He is a happy man who is satisfied with his work and puts all his energy into his work and gives it to his heart. He likes to be different and creative, to make new careers and make new moves, and to do his best to make others happy.

In an interview with Etemad newspaper, he referred to him as a "happiness capsule" and described his unique feature as being different from other DJs, unlike whom he does not wear a shiny suit and does not lubricate his hair, but wears a simple T-shirt. He tries to warm the parliament with his "strange moves." It has stimulated the population of social networks to satisfy the sense of humor and national self-destruction. The phenomenon of Fasnagri is the same as the dark face of the horrible beast of our collective mind.

Younes Younesian, a graduate of Transformation Management, likened Babak Zanjani to DJ Fasnaghari in terms of general popularity.
