= Khwaja Shams al-Din 'Ali =

Leader of the Sarbadars of Sabzewar

- King
- Reign: 1348–1352
- Predecessor: Lutf Allah
- Successor: Yahya Karawi
- Dynasty: Sarbadars
- Religion: Shia Islam

Khwaja Shams al-Din 'Ali (died 1351–52) was the leader of the Sarbadars of Sabzewar from 1348 until his death in 1351/1352.

== Biography ==
Shams al-Din 'Ali was a member of the Sabzewar aristocracy and a leader of one of the city guilds. During Shaikh Hasan Juri's lifetime, he had been an adviser to him, and was a supporter of Hasan's dervish organization. In 1346 he led a group of pro-dervish Sarbadar chiefs in a coup against the leader of the Sarbadars, Muhammad Aytimur, who was overthrown and executed on Shams al-din 'Ali's orders.

After the elimination of Muhammad Aytimur, Shams al-Din 'Ali decided not to formally take over the Sarbadar government; he no doubt realized that a counter-coup was probable and that he would not have enough support amongst the partisans of Wajih ad-Din Mas'ud and the army to maintain his position. Instead he decided to install a compromise candidate, Kulu Isfandiyar, as the head of the Sarbadars. Despite Kulu Isfandiyar's military credentials, he proved unsuitable as a ruler and was forcibly removed from power after only a year by supporters of Mas'ud's brother, Shams al-Din ibn Fazl Allah.

=== Head of State ===
Shams al-Din 'Ali was able to emerge from Kulu Isfandiyar's downfall mostly unscathed. When Shams al-Din ibn Fazl Allah proved himself incapable of paying the army, Shams al-Din 'Ali saw is chance and forced him to abdicate in around 1348. He then assumed control of the government.

One of the first actions of Shams al-Din 'Ali after ascending to the head of the government was to reform the tax administration. In order to avoid his predecessors' failure to pay the military, he increased the revenues of the state and made sure that officials and members of the army were paid in cash. This raised the morale of the military and made it more loyal to him, enabling him to take the offensive against the Ilkhanid claimant Togha Temur and his allies. Togha Temur was eventually compelled to forfeit any claims of suzerainty over the Sarbadars. An attempt to seize Tus from the Jauni Kurban, a tribe allied to Togha Temur, was on the other hand unsuccessful.

Shams al-Din 'Ali's extreme Shi'i leanings as an associate of the dervish organization had a large influence of his administration of the Sarbadar state. Corruption by government officials was heavily suppressed, which helped increase the state finances and fund both the army and several public works programs. In addition, however, he also set up a system of watchers in the cities of the Sarbadars to look for moral violations. Prostitution, drugs, and alcohol were banned with strict consequences for those who violated the law. Still, after Shams al-Din 'Ali came to power the official religion of the Sarbadar state remained Sunni in order to avoid alienating the more moderate Shi'is and Sunnis of the state.

Although Shams al-Din 'Ali's reform program resulted in a level of prosperity not formerly known in the Sarbadar state, it also made him many enemies. Moderate Shi'is were alarmed with his radical moral restrictions, and corrupt government officials suffered under his harsh anti-corruption measures. Even some dervishes opposed him; one of them, Dervish Hindu-i Mashhadi, unsuccessfully rebelled in Damghan. His reign came to a sudden end when a government official, Haidar Qassāb, organized his murder after being punished for allowing a tax account to fall into arrears. He was succeeded by a moderate, Yahya Karawi, in 1351 or 1352.

== Footnotes ==
Preceded by Lutf Allah	Head of the Sarbadars; 1348–1351/2	Succeeded by Yahya Karawi
