= Tomb of Boghrat =

Iranian national heritage site

Coordinates: 36.206°N 57.68506°E

- آرامگاه بقراط
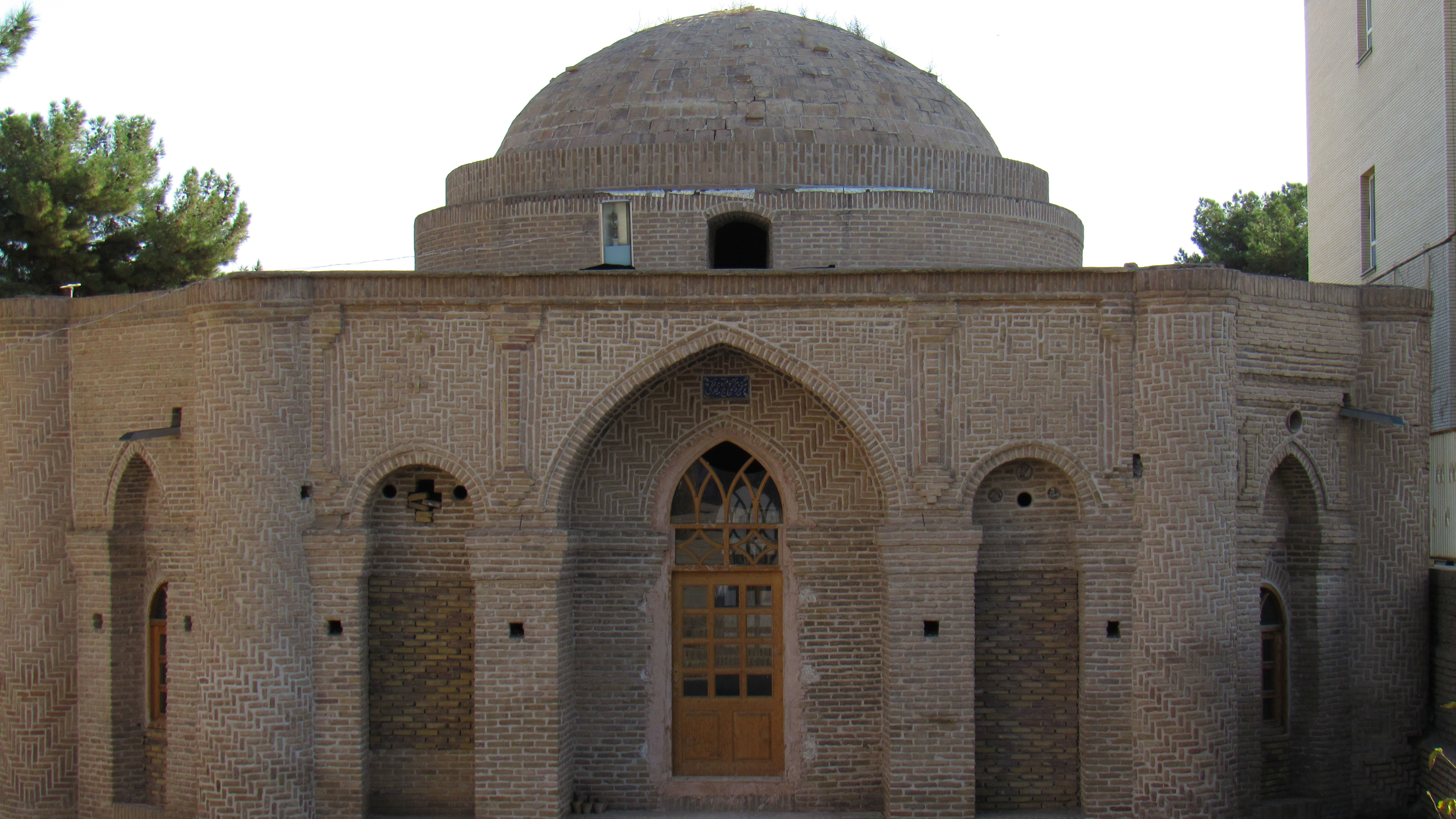
- Interactive map of the Tomb of Boghrat area

General information
- Architectural style: Iranian architecture
- Location: Sabzevar, Iran

The Tomb of Boghrat (Persian: آرامگاه بقراط) is built by the Qajar dynasty and This building is located in Sabzevar.
