= Muhammad Aytimur =

- King
- Reign: 1343-1346
- Predecessor: Wajih ad-Din Mas'ud
- Successor: Kulū Isfandiyār
- Died: August or September 1346
- Dynasty: Sarbadars
- Religion: Shia Islam

Muhammad Aytimur (died August or September 1346) was the leader of the Sarbadars of Sabzewar from 1343 until his death.

== Life ==
Aytimur was born into a lowly family, probably one of the Turkish ḡolāms that Masʿūd, the previous Sarbadār leader, recruited to supplement his bandit and Shiʿite dervish soldiery. He rose to prominence within the Sarbadar state as a military commander under Wajih ad-Din Mas'ud, Mas'ud put Aytimur in charge of Sabzewar during his campaign against the Kartids of Herat in 1342, and again when he invaded Mazandaran in 1344 against the Ilkhanid claimant Togha Temur. In the latter campaign, Mas'ud was killed and his army destroyed; Aytimur's control of the capital at the time resulted in him taking command of the Sarbadar government.

After the annihilation of the Sarbadar army in Mazandaran, Togha Temur resumed the offensive, reoccupying Astarabad and invading Khurasan. Aytimur was able to stop Togha Temur from encroaching any further on Sarbadar territory, but the weakened state of the army eventually prompted him to seek peace. Aytimur agreed to resume the Sarbadars' allegiance to Togha Temur and minted coins in the latter's name, abandoning Mas'ud's alliance with the Chobanids in the process (this alliance had become useless to Aytimur anyway, as the Chobanids were in the midst of a civil war at this time following the death of Hasan Kucek). By this time the Sarbadar state had been reduced to Sabzewar, Nishapur and its environs. Despite the peace, Aytimur still remained wary of Togha Temur. The latter's military advantage against the Sarbadars was somewhat reduced by the defection of one of his most powerful allies, the Jauni Kurban tribe, in 1345 after the death of its leader Arghun Shah. Nevertheless, the need to maintain a perimeter defense against his nominal sovereign meant that Aytimur had to deploy most of the army to the frontier.

Sending the army out of Sabzewar to defend against Togha Temur proved fatal to Aytimur. Most of his supporters were in the regular army; without them he had little support. To rebuild the military forces of the Sarbadars, he had requested the assistance of the radical Shi'i dervishes, but they were hostile to him and as they built up their militia forces, Aytimur's position within the capital weakened. The aristocracy also disliked him due to his common origins. A member of the aristocracy, Khwaja Shams al-Din 'Ali, eventually rounded up several pro-dervish Sarbadar chiefs and they together confronted Aytimur. After voicing their complaints to him, the chiefs deposed Aytimur, who was executed shortly after in August or September 1346. Shams ad-Din 'Ali then installed Kulu Isfandiyar as Aytimur's successor.

== Notes ==
Preceded by Wajih ad-Din Mas'ud	Head of the Sarbadars; 1344–1346	Succeeded by Kulu Isfandiyar
