= Sayed Hassan Amin =

Iranian lawyer

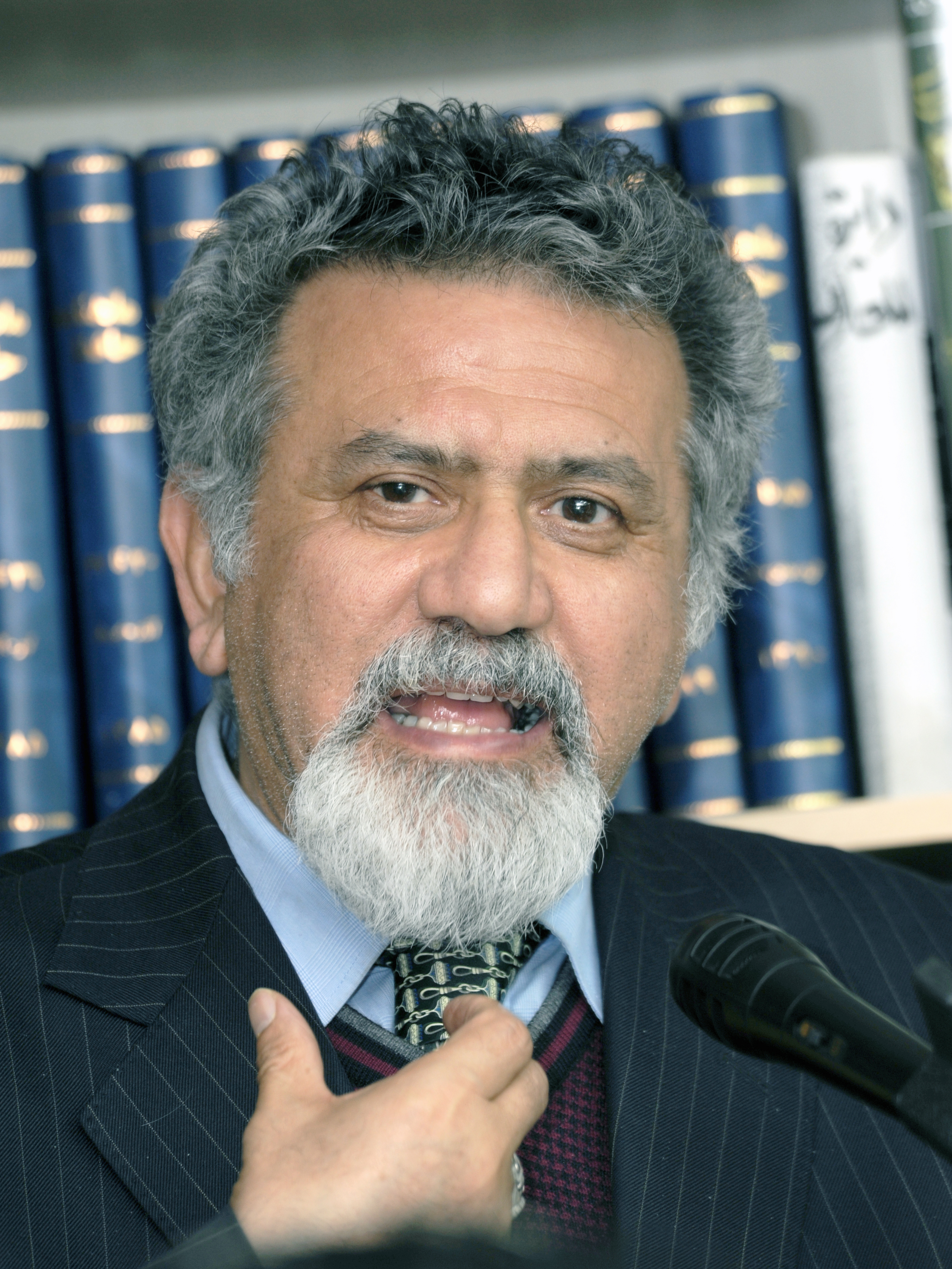
- Born: 28 November 1948 (age 77); Sabzevar, Iran
- Education: University of Tehran; University of Glasgow
- Occupations: Lawyer‌, philosopher‌, scholar
- Political party: Iran Party (until 2019); National Front of Iran (until 2019); Liberal Democrat Party
- Scientific career
- Fields: Law
- Institutions: Glasgow Caledonian University; Faculty of Advocates, Edinburgh; Iran Central Bar Association, Tehran
- Thesis: The legal regime of the continental shelf, with particular reference to the Persian Gulf (1978)
- Doctoral advisor: John P. Grant
- Notable students: Hassan Rouhani
- Website: Official website

Sayed Hassan Amin (Persian: سید حسن امین, born 28 November 1948) is an Iranian lawyer. He was part of a monthly Iranian magazine publication as Editor and Chief.

== Early life and education ==
Born in Sabzavar, Iran, Amin attended Tehran University at the age of 17 and obtained a bachelor in Law with distinction. After completing his apprenticeship in the Ministry of Justice, he qualified as a judge, working in judicial capacities in Iran and reading for his LLM (Masters in private law) at the University of Tehran.

He went to Glasgow University in Scotland, where he obtained his PhD in 1978 under the supervision of John Grant, who was later the dean of the Faculty of Law at the same university, as well as a Professor of Law at Lewis & Clark Law School.

Amin started his examinations and practical apprenticeship with solicitors under the regulations of the Faculty of Advocates in July 1980 in Scotland and was admitted as a member of the Faculty of Advocates on 10 July 1992.

== Academic career ==
Amin is a trustee of the Scottish Inter-cultural Association. This organisation is based in Scotland which focuses on supporting intercultural understanding and supporting integration within diverse communities.

He was elected as a fellow of the Royal Asiatic Society of Great Britain and Ireland in 2026. He was previously a patron of Prisoners Abroad 1997/98.

Amin has occupied positions of Professor of Law at Tehran University, Glasgow Caledonian University, Beijing Foreign Studies University and is currently an International Honorary Professor at Haikm Sabzevari University.

== Legal practice ==
Prof. S H Amin authored the Iran section considering the legal system, foreign investment and commercial law in the International Business Series Legal Aspects of Doing Business in the Middle East edited by Prof. Dennis Campbell (1986).

He also contributed to peer reviewed Modern Legal Systems Cyclopedia collated by general editor Prof. Kenneth Robert Redden (1985).

== Cited Reception ==
A selection of reviews on previous books by Prof. Sayed Hassan Amin:

1. "the latest of a long line of authoritative contributions by this author...' a serious definitive legal study and a valuable work of reference ....".
2. "Prof Hassan Amin on Iranian and Islamic law and he is a prolific writer on these subjects ...".
3. "Hassan Amin's name is quite familiar to the legal circles and he has a reputation for his works on Middle East legal systems. For those in India who are involved, with or without credentials, in the controversy regarding Islamic law there is an important message in Amin's various works including - that this legal system has in its fabric much more than mere matrimonial law or even personal law. Many aspects of comprehensive Islamic jurisprudence which not only remain unexplored in India but whose very existence is unknown in this country have been this favourite Commercial Arbitration in Islamic and Iranian Law subjects of this learned author ... Amin's book is an extremely valuable addition to the meagre literature in the English language on modern Muslim law.".
4. "Amin undertaking the description of the tangled conflicting claims to territory and access to maritime economic resources in the Gulf. Through the efforts of legal scholars like Dr. Amin, it is hoped that international process in the Gulf can be conducted by means of the peaceful acts of diplomacy, arbitration and negotiation.".
5. "For its originality, for the reference it contains, and the enlightening accounts it conveys. Middle East Legal Systems seems to me an indispensable instrument of work for any person involved in Middle Eastern Affairs".

6. "As an academic jurist, Amin is at his best on constitutions, marine law, the Shari'a and human rights. He is familiar with text and documentation. For democracy and the rules of law. He recommends regional co-ordination, economic development by appropriate technology, "Marshall aid" from the Gulf Cooperation Council to make good the damage of the war between Iran and Iraq and "political, social and cultural progress" without too much Westernisation. Amin tries hard to be objective in his analysis and even-handed between the combatants ... ".

7. "Amin, an international lawyer, covering the legal aspects of Gulf security".

8. "The author gives a fine description of the Shi'a sect in Chapter 3, and a brief introduction of the major Islamic schools of jurisdiction in chapter 4.".

9."When all is said and done, this remains a fascinating book and one which attempts to fill a very real gap in the English language literature. One can only hope for an enlarged second edition fairly soon."

10. "Prof. Amin's book ... is admirably brief and is notable for the clear and practical information given in it".
