= Amir Shahi Sabzavari =

Persian poet (??–1453)

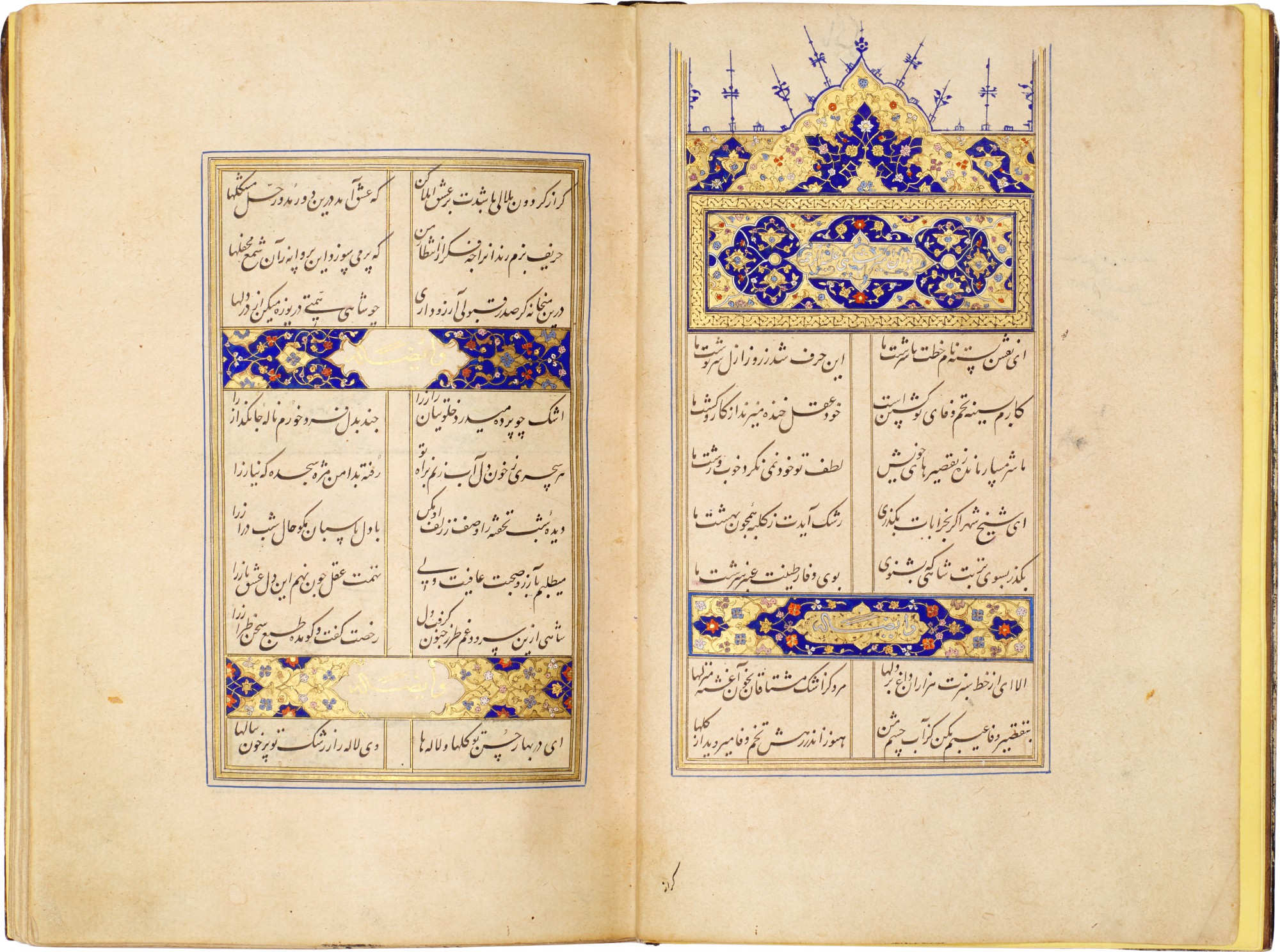
16th-century Persian manuscript of Amir Shahi's divan, created in Safavid Iran

Amir Shahi Sabzavari (also spelled Sabzevari, Sabzawari; died 1453) was a Persian poet who flourished in 15th-century Timurid Iran. He was descended from the Sarbadars of Sabzevar.

He composed a response to the opening ghazal of Hafez's divan. He died in Astarabad (present-day Gorgan), and was buried in the family shrine in Sabzevar.
