= Kulū Isfandiyār =

Kulu Isfansiyar
- King
- Reign: 1346–1347
- Predecessor: Muhammad Aytimur
- Successor: Lutf Allah
- Died: 1361
- Dynasty: Sarbadars
- Religion: Shia Islam

Kulū Isfandiyār (Persian: کلو اسفندیار) was the leader of the Sarbadars of Sabzewar from 1346 until around 1347.

== Career ==
Kulu Isfandiyar was a military commander under Wajih ad-Din Mas'ud and was one of his supporters. In 1346 was installed as head of state by Khwaja Shams al-Din 'Ali, the head of the pro-dervish party that had just overthrown and executed Muhammad Aytimur. Kulu Isfandiyar was considered to be a good compromise candidate; not only did the dervishes think highly of him, but his Bashtini origins (Mas'ud's family came from there) and his military credentials were thought to be sufficient to win over Mas'ud's supporters as well.

Kulu Isfandiyar's reign, however, turned out to be short. The sources disagree on the nature of his downfall, but it is probable that the Bashtinis and the pro-Mas'udi factions of the army complained about the government's failure to pay them and used this as a pretext to overthrow Kulu Isfandiyar in late 1346/1347. His place was taken by Mas'ud's brother Shams al-Din ibn Fazl Allah.

== Notes ==
Preceded by Muhammad Aytimur	Head of the Sarbadars; 1346–1347	Succeeded by Lutf Allah
