= Mohammad Parvin Gonabadi =

Iranian literary scholar and politician

- محمد پروین گنابادی
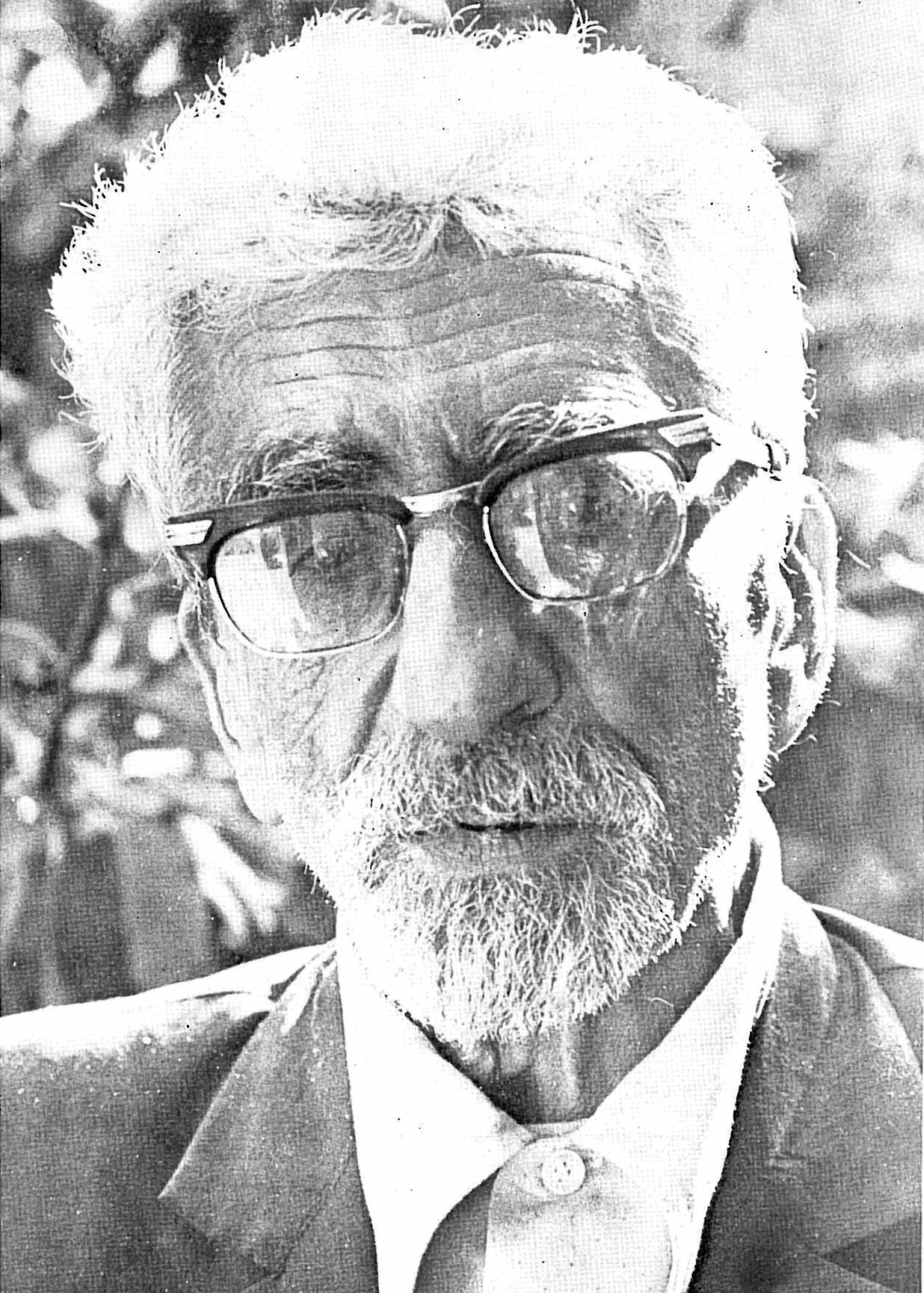
- Parvin Gonabadi in 1975

Member of Parliament of Iran
- In office 7 March 1944 – 12 March 1946
- Constituency: Sabzevar

Personal details
- Born: Gonabad, Khorasan
- Party: Tudeh Party (1940s); Socialist Party (1920s); Democrat Party (1910s)

Mohammad Parvin Gonabadi (Persian: محمد پروین گنابادی, romanized: Moḥammad Parvin Gonābādi) was an Iranian literary scholar and politician.

== Early life and education ==
Parvin Gonabadi was born in Gonabad into a clerical family. He went to Mashhad to study and became a teacher, holding literacy courses for workers and contributing to formation of a teacher's trade union.

== Professional career ==
Parvin Gonabadi edited a newspaper in Mashhad, where he also served as the headmaster of the city's main state school for girls. He published his poems and later helped Ali-Akbar Dehkhoda to write the landmark Loghatnameh.

== Political career ==
He joined the Democrat Party's chapter in Mashhad, and the Socialist Party during the 1920s. Due to his political activities, he was briefly imprisoned in 1926 and 1929.

In the first congress of Tudeh Party held in 1944, he was elected as a member of the central committee, though he was considered a "newcomer". In the elections for the 14th term of Iranian parliament, he took eat as the deputy for Sabzevar. He was excluded from the party's central committee in 1946, because he was not a "not [a] full-fledged Marxist".
