= Rezai family =

The Rezai Family
- Current region: Iran, Costa Rica, United States, United Kingdom
- Origin: Sabzevar, Persia

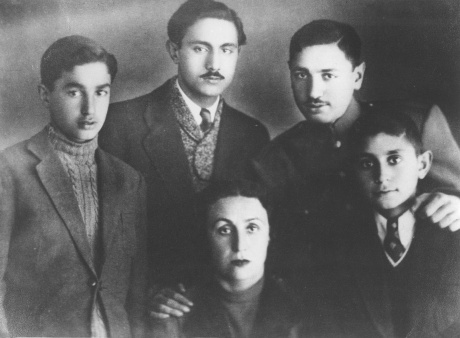
The four Rezai brothers

Before the Islamic Revolution of 1979, the Rezai family was one of the richest and most powerful families in Iran. The four brothers, Ali, Mahmood, Abbas and Ghassem used their savvy, and a small inheritance from their father who had died when Ghassem, the youngest of the brothers was only 40 days old, to build one of the biggest business empires in Iran if not the Middle East at the time. The businesses were largely based on "theaters, tobacco and mining". Ali Rezai, the oldest of the brothers, focused on a steel mill, while Mahmood developed mining interests—initially mining chromium in the Dasht-e Kavir, and using his success to develop the Sarcheshmeh copper mine. Their various business successes meant that by 1975 they employed over 8,000 people, and had an annual turnover of $300 million.

Politically, they had backed Shah Mohammad Reza Pahlavi, and Ali Rezai became a senator in the Majlis of Iran in 1975.

As the monarchy fell in 1979, because of their vast fortune and ties to the royal family, the Rezai's had to go into exile. Ali fled by air, and, by various means, all the family members "escaped to New York City, Houston, Los Angeles and Costa Rica" by 1980. Ghassem Rezai died in May 2014.
