= Yahya Karawi =

- King
- Reign: 1353-1356
- Predecessor: Khwaja Shams al-Din 'Ali
- Successor: Zahir al-Din Karawi
- Died: 1355/1356
- Dynasty: Sarbadars
- Religion: Shia Islam

Yahya Karawi (died 1355/56) was the leader of the Sarbadars of Sabzewar from around 1353 until his death.

== Reign ==
Yahya, an aristocrat, came to power after the assassination of Khwaja Shams al-Din 'Ali in around 1351. He had been informed beforehand about the assassination plot, and afterwards protected Shams al-Din 'Ali's murderer, Haidar Qassib. Unlike his predecessor, Yahya was a religious moderate and did not maintain many of Shams al-Din Ali's social programs.

Early in his reign, Yahya undertook negotiations with the Ilkhanid claimant Togha Temur, who ruled in Astarabad. The Sarbadars had achieved independence from Togha Temur, but the two sides had subsequently come to a military stalemate. As a result of these negotiations, Yahya agreed to recognize Togha Temur as his suzerain and to pay him tribute. Furthermore, he agreed to present himself before the khan on an annual basis to renew his pledge of loyalty, something no Sarbadar leader had ever been compelled to do before. The Sarbadars therefore became vassals to the khan.

In fact, this was all part of a plan by Yahya to eliminate Togha Temur for good. The appearance of the khan's name on Sarbadar coinage as well as the shipment of the promised tribute allayed Togha Temur's doubts about the sincerity of Yahya's intentions. Therefore, when Yahya and a group of 300 Sarbadars showed up at Togha Temur's camp in December 1353, he let Yahya and two others enter his tent armed. As the two leaders were speaking, one of the Sarbadars drew an axe and struck Togha Temur. Yahya then decapitated the khan. After Togha Temur was killed, the Sarbadars spread out through the camp and attacked the khan's troops. Most of them were quickly slaughtered. The Sarbadars even killed all of the animals in the camp in an effort to cripple the nomads' way of life. His victory complete, Yahya then annexed the khan's domains, including Astarabad.

Unfortunately for Yahya, he did not long outlast the khan. In 1355 or 1356 he was assassinated. His nephew, Zahir al-Din Karawi, was then installed by Haidar Qassib as head of the Sarbadars.

== Notes ==
Preceded by Khwaja Shams al-Din 'Ali	Head of the Sarbadars; 1351–1355/6	Succeeded by Zahir al-Din Karawi
