= Islamic Azad University, Sabzevar Branch =

Coordinates: 36°13′16″N 57°41′31″E

- دانشگاه آزاد اسلامی واحد سبزوار; Danushgah-e Âzad-e Eslâmi-ye Vahed-e Sibzevar
- Type: Private (Islamic Azad University System)
- Established: 1985
- Affiliations: Islamic Azad University
- President: Dr. Ghasem Ghasemi
- Academic staff: 250
- Students: 6,500
- Location: Sabzevar, Razavi Khorasan, Iran
- Campus: Urban/suburban
- Colors
- Website: www.iaus.ac.ir

The Islamic Azad University, Sabzevar Branch was founded in 1985 in Sabzevar, the second largest city in the Khorasan province in the north east of Iran. Located at the center of a largely agricultural region, Sabzevar has a population of around two hundred thousands, mainly engaged in commerce and small industry.

== Courses and degrees ==
- Food science and technology (B.Sc., M.Sc., Ph.D..)
- Persian Literature (B.A., M.A, PhD..)
- Islamic philosophy (M.A)
- Islamic jurisprudence (B.A)
- Accounting (B.A.)
- Electronics (B.Sc.)
- Biomedical Engineering (B.Sc.)
- Nursing (B.Nurs.)
- Education (B.A.)
- Public health (HND.)
- Computer Engineering (HND, B.SC.)
- Economics (B.SC.)
- Educational management (B.SC.)
- Carpet design and production (HND)

== See also ==
- Hakim Sabzevari University
