= Sarbadars =

State in Iran from 1337 to 1381

- 1337–1381
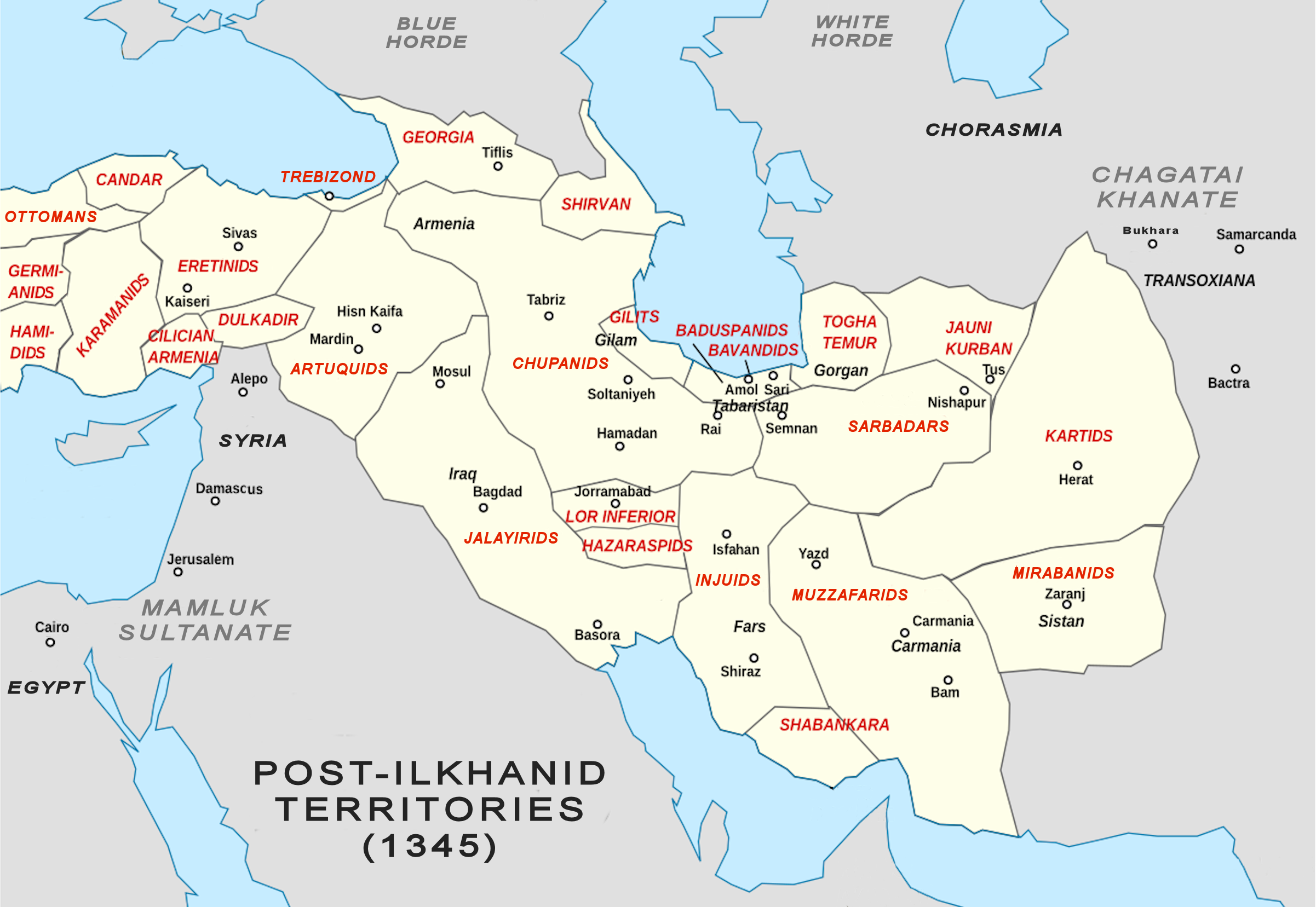
- Territory of the Sarbadars in the Post-Ilkhanid period (1345)
- Capital: Sabzevar
- Common languages: Persian
- Government: Absolute Monarchy
- Leader
  - 1332–1338: Abd al-Razzaq ibn Fazlullah
  - 1338–1343: Wajih ad-Din Mas'ud
  - 1343–1346: Muhammad Temur
  - 1379–1381: Khwaja 'Ali-yi Mu'ayyad ibn Masud
- History
  - Independence from the Ilkhanate: 1337
  - Khwaja Ali-yi Mu'ayyad submits to Timur: 1381
| Preceded by | Succeeded by |
| Ilkhanate | Timurid Empire; Kurtid dynasty |
- Today part of: Iran; Turkmenistan

The Sarbadars (from Persian: سربدار sarbadār, "head on gallows"; also known as Sarbedaran سربداران) were a mixture of religious dervishes and secular rulers that came to rule over part of western Khurasan in the midst of the disintegration of the Mongol Ilkhanate in the mid-14th century (established in 1337). Centered in their capital of Sabzavar, they continued their reign until Khwaja 'Ali-yi Mu'ayyad submitted to Timur in 1381, and were one of the few groups that managed to mostly avoid Timur's famous brutality.

== Religion ==
The Sarbadar state was marked by divisions in religious belief during its existence. Its rulers were Shi'i, though often Sunnis claimed leadership among the people with the support of Ilkhanid rulers. The leadership of the Shi'is stemmed chiefly from the charisma of Sheikh Khalifa; a scholar from Mazandaran, the shaikh had arrived in Khurasan some years before the founding of the Sarbadar state and was subsequently murdered by Sunnis. His successor, Hasan Juri, established the former's practices in the Sarbadar state. The followers of these practices were known as "Sabzavaris" after the city. The Sabzavaris, however, were divided; among their number were moderate Shi'is who were often at odds with the dervishes, adherents of a mystic ideology. The capital city of Sabzavar likely had a large Shi'ite community, but as the Sarbadars conquered the neighboring territory, they acquired cities with Sunni populations.

== Government ==
The Sarbadars are unique among the major contenders in post-Ilkhanid Persia in that none of their leaders ruled as legitimate sovereigns. None of them had a legitimate claim to the Ilkhanid throne, or were related to a Mongol or any other royal house, and none of them had previously held a high post within the Ilkhanate. While they on occasion recognized claimants to the Ilkhanid throne as their overlord, they did so purely as a matter of convenience, and in all other aspects they had no ties to the Ilkhanate. This fact had a strong influence regarding the nature of the Sarbadar political state.

The Sarbadars had a form of government which would, in modern times, probably be identified as an oligarchy or a republic. Unlike their neighbors, the Sarbadars had no dynastic lines; power usually went to the most ambitious. This view is not universally held, however. Some point to the fact that one of the Sarbadar rulers, Vajih al-Din Mas'ud, produced a son who also eventually reigned, named Lutf Allah. While seven other rulers separated the reign of Mas'ud and that of his son, those seven rulers are sometimes considered regents for Lutf Allah, until he was old enough to grab power for himself. Nevertheless, the seven are generally considered the heads of state in their own right.

A ruler would hold power for as long as he could; the fact that several of them met violent deaths was a sign of the instability that plagued the state for most of its existence. The founder of the Sabadar state, 'Abd al-Razzaq, used the title of amir during his reign. While many of the Sarbadar leaders were secular, the dervishes also had their turns in power, and on occasion they ruled the state in co-dominion with each other; such partnerships, however, tended to fall apart quickly. Because the two sides held radically different views on how the Sarbadar government should be run, there were often drastic changes in policy as one side would supplant the other as the most powerful.

== History ==
=== Foundation ===
The Sarbadar state came into existence around early 1337. At that time, much of Khurasan was under the control of the Ilkhanid claimant Togha Temur and his amirs. One of his subjects, 'Ala' al-Din Muhammad, had jurisdiction over the city of Sabzavar. His oppressive taxation of the area caused an 'Abd al-Razzaq, a member of the feudal ruling class, to murder a government official in Bashtin, a district of the city. The official was a nephew of 'Ala' al-Din, and 'Abd al-Razzaq raised the standard of revolt. The rebels at first settled in the mountains, where they defeated militias sent against them and raided caravans and herds of cattle, and then in the summer of 1337 took possession of Sabzavar. Togha Temur was most likely campaigning in the west at this time, against the Jalayirids, making him unable to deal with the revolt. 'Abd al-Razzaq took the title of amir and had coins made in his name, but he was stabbed to death by his brother Vajih al-Din Mas'ud during an argument in 1338. Mas'ud, taking command of the Sarbadars, made peace with Togha Temur, promising to recognize him as sovereign and to pay taxes to him. The khan agreed, in the hope that it would put a stop to the Sarbadar raids on his supply trains.

In the meantime, Shaikh Kalifa's follower Hasan Juri had been preaching in towns all across Khurasan, with great success. His accomplishments attracted the suspicion of the government authorities, and in May 1336 he fled to eastern Iraq. When he returned some years later, Togha Temur's lieutenant and commander of the Ja'un-i Qurban Arghun Shah had him arrested in 1339 or 1340. He was eventually released, perhaps due to the insistence of Mas'ud, who soon after decided to take advantage of Hasan Juri's popularity. He joined Hasan's order as a novice, and had him proclaimed as joint ruler. Hasan Juri proclaimed that the Twelfth Imam would soon return. While the sharing of power began well, differences quickly emerged between the two. Mas'ud believed in accepting the nominal suzerainty of Togha Temur, while Hasan Juri was intent on establishing a Shi'i state. The two rulers each gained bases of support; the former had his family and the gentry, while the latter had the dervishes, the aristocracy, and the trade guilds. Both also had their own armed forces; Mas'ud had 12,000 armed peasants and a bodyguard of 700 Turkish slave troops, while Hasan Juri had an army composed of artisans and merchants.

In 1340 Mas'ud moved against the Ja'un-i Qurban under Arghun Shah; the latter was forced to abandon Nishapur and retreat to Tus. The Sarbadars continued to mint coins in Togha Temur's name, in the hope that he would ignore this move as he was campaigning in the west again at this time. The khan, however, moved against them; his forces were destroyed, and while fleeing to Mazandaran several important figures such as 'Ala' al-Din (formerly in charge of Sabzavar), 'Abd-Allah, and Togha's own brother 'Ali Ke'un were killed. The Sarbadars gained control of Jajarm, Damghan and Simnan, along with Togha's capital of Gurgan. Mas'ud and Hasan Juri, however, soon came into disagreement over several issues. Mas'ud, following the defeat of Togha Temur, gained a new suzerain in the form of Hasan Kucek of the Chobanids, as well as the latter's puppet khan Sulaiman. Mas'ud considered the move necessary; with the conquest of Simnan, the Chobanids were now neighbors. Since the Chobanids were Sunnis, however, this doubtless did not go over well with Mas'ud's co-ruler.

With the defeat of the Ja'un-i Qurban and Togha Temur, the Sarbadars still had one more force to contend with in Khurasan: the Kartids of Herat. Their leader Mu'izz al-Din Husain also recognized Togha Temur's overlordship, and when the Sarbadars threw off the khan's nominal rule, they became enemies. The Sarbadars decided to destroy the Kartids with an offensive campaign. The armies of the two forces met at the Battle of Zava on July 18, 1342. The battle started out well for the Sarbadars, but then Hasan Juri was taken and killed. His supporters, assuming (perhaps correctly) that his death had been the result of an assassin of Mas'ud, promptly retreated, turning the tide of the battle. The Kartids therefore survived. Following the return home, Mas'ud attempted to rule without the support of the dervishes, but his power was decreased. He attempted to end the threat of Togha Temur, who had in the meantime made his camp in the Amul region and was preventing the Sarbadars from staying in contact with the Chobanids. Mas'ud undertook a campaign against him in 1344 which got off to a good start, but ended in disaster. On the route from Sari to Amul, the Sarbadar army was trapped in a pincer movement, and Mas'ud was taken prisoner and executed. Most of the Sarbadar conquests were lost as a result of the two losses; only the region around Sabzavar, as well as maybe Juvain and Nishapur remained in their hands. Togha Temur returned to Gurgan and once again gained the allegiance of the Sarbadars.

=== 1344–1361 ===
Mas'ud's first three successors ruled for a period totaling only three years. Both of the first two men had served as his military commanders; Mas'ud's brother Shams al-Din came next, only to fall as well. These internal conflicts were countered by good news on the external front; namely, the death of Arghun Shah in 1343, and the rise of his successor Muhammad Beg, who abandoned the alliance of the Ja'un-i Qurban with Togha Temur in favor of one with the Sarbadars. Shams al-Din was replaced in turn by the dervish Shams al-Din 'Ali in 1347, marking the loss of power by Mas'ud's adherents. Shams al-Din 'Ali was an effective administrator, reorganizing the state finances, carrying out tax reforms, and paying officials in cash. As a religious man, he attempted to stamp out prostitution, drugs and alcohol, and lived a simple life. His military was effective; although he failed to take Tus, he was able to destroy a rebellion in Damghan in the west. He was, however, prevented from turning the Sarbadar state to the Shi'i creed by Mas'ud's supporters, who kept the government Sunni. In the meantime, he gained enemies among the opponents of the dervishes, as well as the corrupt officials of the state that hated his reforms. One of these officials named Haidar Qassab, who was possibly a member of the artisan guild, murdered him around 1352.

Shams al-Din 'Ali's successor was a member of the Sabzavari aristocracy named Yahya Karavi. Yahya was forced to deal with Togha Temur, who in spite of the loss of the allegiance of the Ja'un-i Qurban and, in 1349, the Kartids, still was a danger of the Sarbadars. His army of 50,000 dwarfed the Sarbadar army, which numbered only around 22,000. Yahya neutralized the khan by recognizing him as suzerain, striking coins in his name and paying taxes to him. He also promised to visit Togha Temur once a year. He was probably making one of these visits when he arrived in November or December 1353 at the khan's camp of Sultan-Duvin near Astarabad. Yahya and a group of his followers entered the camp and were allowed into Togha Temur's tent. There, they murdered the khan and his courtiers, then put to death the Mongol troops and killed the nomads' herds. With the death of Togha Temur, the last serious contender for the Ilkhanid throne was gone. The Sarbadar lands then expanded to the borders reached by Mas'ud, and then gained even more: the area around Ray, the city of Tus, and Astarabad and Shasman. Yahya, however, was murdered around 1356, possibly at the hands of Mas'ud's adherents. Mas'ud's son Lutf Allah was possibly involved in the murder.

Haidar Qassib, the murderer of Shams al-Din 'Ali, now took advantage of the situation. Arriving from Astarabad, ostensibly to hunt down Yahya's killers, he installed Yahya's nephew Zahir al-Din Karavi to rule. Soon afterwards, however, he removed him from power and ruled in his own name. Unfortunately for him, he was unpopular with nearly everyone even before he came to power. As a former member of Shams al-Din 'Ali's party, the supporters of Mas'ud disliked him, and his murder of Shams al-Din 'Ali alienated him from the dervishes. Nasr Allah, Lutf Allah's tutor, allied with Yahya's murderers and rose in revolt in Isfara'in, the second city of the Sarbadars. Haidar moved to put the rebellion down, but before he could he was stabbed to death by an assassin hired by a Hasan Damghani. Lutf Allah now gained control of the state, but he soon came into conflict with Hasan Damghani as well. He was defeated, and in the process Mas'ud's adherents were mostly eliminated.

Hasan Damghani was now forced to deal with Amir Vali, who was a son of the former governor of Astarabad before its conquest by the Sarbadars. Amir Vali had taken advantage of Haidar Qassib's move out of Astarabad to return to the city. Amir Vali then claimed to be acting in the name of Luqman, the son of Togha Temur, although he never handed power over to him. Hasan sent two expeditions against him, both of which ended in failure; he himself led a third force, but met no more success, allowing Amir Vali to be in a position to gain more Sarbadar territory. Meanwhile, in the east a radical Shi'i named Darvish 'Aziz revolted and established a theocratic state in Mashhad in the name of the Twelfth Imam. Darvish 'Aziz gained more territory with his conquest of Tus. Hasan recognized that the entire Sarbadar state was in jeopardy: the Sabzavari dervishes might declare their support for the theocratic state at any time. He moved against Darvish 'Aziz, defeated him and destroyed the Mahdist state; Darvish 'Aziz went to Isfahan in exile. Soon afterward, however, an 'Ali-yi Mu'ayyad rose in revolt in Damghan and gained the support of Hasan's enemies. He recalled Darvish 'Aziz from exile and joined his order. While Hasan was besieging the castle of Shaqqan, near Jajarm, 'Ali-yi Mu'ayyad captured Sabzavar around 1361. In the process, he captured the possessions and families of many of Hasan's followers. When he demanded Hasan's head, they therefore complied.

=== Decline and submission to Timur ===
'Ali-yi Mu'ayyad enjoyed, by far, the longest reign out of all the Sarbadar rulers. The partnership with Darvish 'Aziz lasted for ten months; while 'Ali-yi Mu'ayyad, who was Shi'i, helped raised Shi'ism to the state religion, he opposed several of Darvish 'Aziz's theocratic ideas. Tensions were high when a campaign was begun against the Kartids of Herat. Even before they had met any resistance, the Sarbadar army erupted in violence. While on the march, 'Ali's men picked a quarrel with the dervishes; Darvish 'Aziz and many of his followers were killed trying to escape. 'Ali returned and attempted to destroy the power of the dervishes completely. He moved against their organization and forced them out of Sabzavar, and even destroyed the graves of Shaikh Khalifa and Hasan Juri. The dervishes, however, fled, being granted refuge by the Kartids, the Ja'un-i Qurban, and the Muzaffarids of Shiraz. Meanwhile, the Ja'un-i Qurban regained Tus, though the two sides seemed to have no further conflict. Amir Vali gained control of Simnan and Bistam, though Astarabad was temporarily reconquered by the Sarbadars (1365/6-1368/9. Administratively, 'Ali increased the quality of the coinage, and instituted tax reforms.

In 1370 Mu'izz al-Din Husain of the Kartids died, to be succeeded by his sons Ghiyas al-Din Pir 'Ali and Malik Muhammad. Pir 'Ali, a grandson of Togha Temur by his mother Sultan Khatun, considered the Sarbadars his enemy, and used the emigrant Sabzavaris in his realm to stir up discontent against Ali-yi Mu'ayyad. The latter responded by supporting Malik Muhammad, who ruled a small part of the Kartid lands from Sarakhs. Pir 'Ali then moved against his stepbrother, but Ali-yi Mu'ayyad stopped him by a flanking attack after overcoming one of Pir 'Ali's castles near the border, whose commanders were Sabzavaris. Pir 'Ali was forced to come to terms with his stepbrother. The fighting with the Sabadars, however, continued, and 'Ali was forced to throw his forces to defend Nishapur, leaving the western part of his lands exposed. At the same time, he made a hostile enemy out of Shah Shuja of the Muzaffarids. A revolt in 1373 in Kirman against Shah Shuja led by Pahlavan Asad received military support from 'Ali, but the rebellion was defeated in December 1374. The dervishes in Shiraz, meanwhile, found a leader in Rukn al-Din, a former member of Darvish 'Aziz's order. Shah Shuja gave them money and arms, and they conquered Sabzavar around 1376, forcing 'Ali to flee to Amir Vali. At about the same time, Nishapur was conquered by the Kartids of Pir 'Ali.

The new government in Sabzavar established a Shi'i rule based on the teachings of Hasan Juri. Not long afterward, however, Amir Vali arrived before the city. His group included Ali-yi Mu'ayyad, as well as the Muzaffarid Shah Mansur. 'Ali was reinstated as Sarbadar ruler once the city was captured, but many of his reforms had been abandoned. The partnership with Amir Vali furthermore did not last, and in 1381 the latter was besieging Sabzavar again. 'Ali, believing he had little other choice, asked for the assistance of Timur the Lame. He submitted to the conqueror in Nishapur, and Timur responded by ravaging Amir Vali's lands in Gurgan and Mazandaran. In Radkan, as he was returning from the victorious campaign, he confirmed 'Ali as governor of Sabzavar.

'Ali remained loyal to Timur, dying in 1386 after being wounded during Timur's campaign in Lesser Luristan. As a reward for this loyalty, Timur never occupied Sabzavar with his own troops, and allowed 'Ali to retain his local administration. After 'Ali's death, the Sarbadar territories were split amongst his relatives, who mostly remained loyal to Timur as well and took part in his campaigns. Muluk Sabzavari did become involved with the revolt of Hajji Beg of the Ja'un-i Qurban (which had been forcibly submitted to Timur's rule around 1381) in Tus in 1389, and afterwards sought refuge with the Muzaffarid Shah Mansur in Isfahan, but was eventually pardoned by Timur and given the governorship of Basra near the end of 1393. That same year, following the conquest of Baghdad by Timur, the governorship of that city was given to 'Ali's nephew Khwaja Mas'ud Sabzavari, who had a force of 3,000 Sarbadars. Despite this, he was forced to retreat in 1394 when Sultan Ahmad of the Jalayirids marched to recapture the city, and he retreated to Shushtar. Following the death of Timur, the Sarbadars slowly fell out of prominence.

== Legacy ==
Historically, the Sarbadars have been considered a robber-state; they have been accused of being a group of religious fanatics who terrorized their neighbors, with little regard for legitimate rule. Considering the conduct of nearly all of the Persian states during this time period, this assessment seems needlessly harsh. Other historians have considered the Sarbadars to be an example of class struggle; the downtrodden rising up against oppressive taxation by their masters, and establishing a republic in the middle of several feudal states. This, however, is not entirely accurate either. 'Abd al-Razzaq was a member of the ruling class, which was taxed the heaviest at the time. It could however be said that it was definitely a struggle of a people with a certain belief system against an oppressive ruler desiring to establish what could be easily be labelled a republic. Religious orders were common in this period of Persian history, as the order of the Ilkhanate fell apart, to be replaced by a period of anarchy and incessant warfare. Aside from the Safavid dynasty of Persia in the 16th century, the Sarbadars were probably the most successful example of such orders, although they rarely managed to achieve the state that they so desired.

== Sarbadar influence ==
The Sarbadars had an indirect influence on northern Iran, where several Shi'i attempts to gain power locally were launched:

Mazandaran: During Shams al-Din 'Ali's reign, a supporter of Hasan Juri named 'Izz al-Din, with a group of fellow adherents, returned to his homeland in Mazandaran. They were apparently unable to accept the moderate tone taken by the Sabadars in Sabzavar. 'Izz al-Din died en route, leaving his son Sayyid Qivan al-Din (also known as Mir-i Buzurg) to lead the group. They arrived in Amul and set up a state together with Kiya Afrasiyab, a son of a Hasan Chulabi, who had destroyed the local Bavand dynasty in 1349. Like the Sarbadars, conflict soon erupted in this state between the secular rulers and the dervishes; the latter eventually won. Destroyed in 1392 by Timur, it emerged once more after his death, but only for a brief time.

Gilan: In Gilan, in northwestern Persia, a group of Shi'i shaikhs received help from the Mazandarani dervishes, and gained control of the region under Shaikh Amir Kiya. Due to the region's relative obscurity, the state survived until 1592, when it was absorbed by the Safavid Persians.

== Other Sarbadars ==
Samarkand: A group of "sarbadars" (it is not known whether they actually called themselves that) was instrumental of the defeat of the khan of Moghulistan (the Eastern Chagatai Khanate), Ilyas Khoja, during his invasion of the Western Chagatai Khanate in 1365. The sarbadars of Samarkand closed the gates of the city and refused to open them for the invader. They withstood the subsequent siege and organized ambushes on the enemy until an epidemic began striking down the Moghul horses, forcing them to retreat. Shortly afterwards, an early ally of Timur, Husayn, forced his way into Samarkand and put most of the sarbadar leaders to death. Despite being a nomad, Timur decided to court the assistance of the sedentary sarbadars following the breakdown of the alliance with Husayn, and they were an important factor in his rise to power in the Chagatai horde.

== Rulers ==
- Abd al-Razzaq ibn Fazlullah (1332–1338)
- Wajih ad-Din Masud ibn Fazlullah (1338–1343)
- Muhammad Ay Temur (1343–1346)
- Kulū Isfendiyar (1346–1347)
- Lutf Allah (1347-1348 d.1361)
- Khwaja Tadj ad-Din Ali (1348–1353)
- Yahyā Karābi (1353–1356)
- Zahir ad-Din (1358–1359)
- Haidar al-Qassab (1359–1360)
- Lutf Allah (restored) (1360–1361)
- Hasan al-Damghani (1361–1364)
- Khwaja 'Ali-yi Mu'ayyad ibn Masud (1364-1376 d.1386)
- Rukn ad-Din (1376–1379)
- Khwaja 'Ali-yi Mu'ayyad ibn Masud (restored) (1379–1386)

== Genealogy of Sarbadars ==
Sarbadars

Sarbadars

Fadlullah | al-Karabi
Abdur-Razzaq r. 1336–1338 | Mas'ud r. 1338–1343 | Shams ad-Din r. 1347–1347 | Ali r. 1348–1353 | Yahya r. 1353–1356 | al-Karabi | Haydar r. 1356–1356
Ay-Timur r. 1343–1346 | Lutfullah r. 1347–1348, 1356–1358 | Kulu-Isfandiyar r. 1346–1347 | Rukn ad-Din r. 1376–1379 | Ali-i-Mu'ayyad r. 1362–1376, 1379–1381 | Zahir ad-Din r. 1356–1356 | Hasan r. 1358–1362

== See also ==
- List of Shi'a Muslims dynasties
