= Hakim Sabzevari University =

Public university in Iran

- دانشگاه حکیم سبزواری
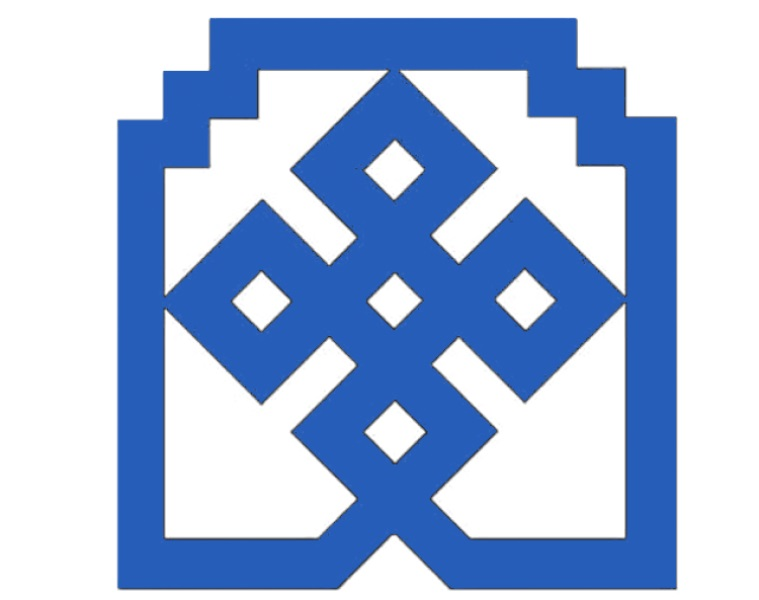
- Hakim Sabzevari University (HSU)
- Former name: Tarbiat Moallem University
- Type: Public
- Established: 2011
- President: MohammadAli Zanganeh Asadi
- Vice-president: Samadi Biniazi
- Administrative staff: 267
- Students: 8589
- Location: Sabzevar, Iran; 36°12′45″N 57°40′55″E
- Website: en.hsu.ac.ir

Hakim Sabzevari University (HSU; Persian: دانشگاه حکیم سبزواری, Daneshgah-e Hakim Sabzevari, Global WHED ID= IAU-016158) is one of the most developed public universities in Sabzevar city at Razavi Khorasan province, Iran.It was established in 1987 as a branch of Tarbiat Moallem University of Tehran but later became independent and it was renamed to Hakim Sabzevari University in 2011, after Hadi Sabzevari, a prominent Iranian philosopher and theologian. HSU offers 139 bachelors, masters, and Ph.D. programs to more than 8152 male and female students studying under about 263 faculty members in 10 departments. According to the Islamic World Science Citation Center statistics, HSU is ranked 41st in Iran amongst other universities of Ministry of Science, Research and Technology. The university currently consists of 10 faculties.

== Faculties and divisions ==
- Faculty of Sciences: Biology, Physics, Chemistry
- Faculty of Engineering: Mechanical Engineering, Civil Engineering, Material Engineering, Polymer Engineering, Aerospace Engineering
- Faculty of Mathematics & Computer Sciences: Pure Mathematics, Applied Mathematics, Statistics
- Faculty of Petroleum and Chemical Engineering: Petroleum Engineering, Chemical Engineering
- Faculty of Sport Sciences: General Sport Sciences, Sport Management, Exercises Physiology, Motor Behavior
- Faculty of Architecture & Urbanism: Architecture, Restoration of Historic Buildings
- Faculty of Geography & Environmental Sciences: Climatology & Geomorphology, Geography and Urban & Rural Planning, Environmental engineering, Remote sensing and GIS.
- Faculty of Letters & Humanities: English Language and Literature, Persian Language and Literature, French Language and Literature, Political Sciences, Educational Sciences
- Faculty of Theology and Islamic Studies: Philosophy &Islamic Wisdom, Arabic Language & Literature, Jurisprudence & the Fundamentals of Islamic Law, Law, Quranic & Hadith Studies, Islamic Knowledge
- Faculty of Electrical & Computer Engineering: Biomedical Engineering, Power Engineering, Electrical Engineering, Computer Engineering, Mechatronics Engineering
- Faculty of Modern Technologies: Industrial Engineering, Engineering Sciences, Computer Engineering (IT)

== Former chancellors ==
- Dr.Ali Tasnimi (2024–present)
- Prof. Mohammad Ali Zanganeh Asadi (2020–2024)

== See also ==
- Sabzevar University of Medical Sciences
- Islamic Azad University of Sabzevar
