= Sabzevar University of Medical Sciences =

- دانشگاه علوم پزشکی و خدمات بهداشتی درمانی سبزوار
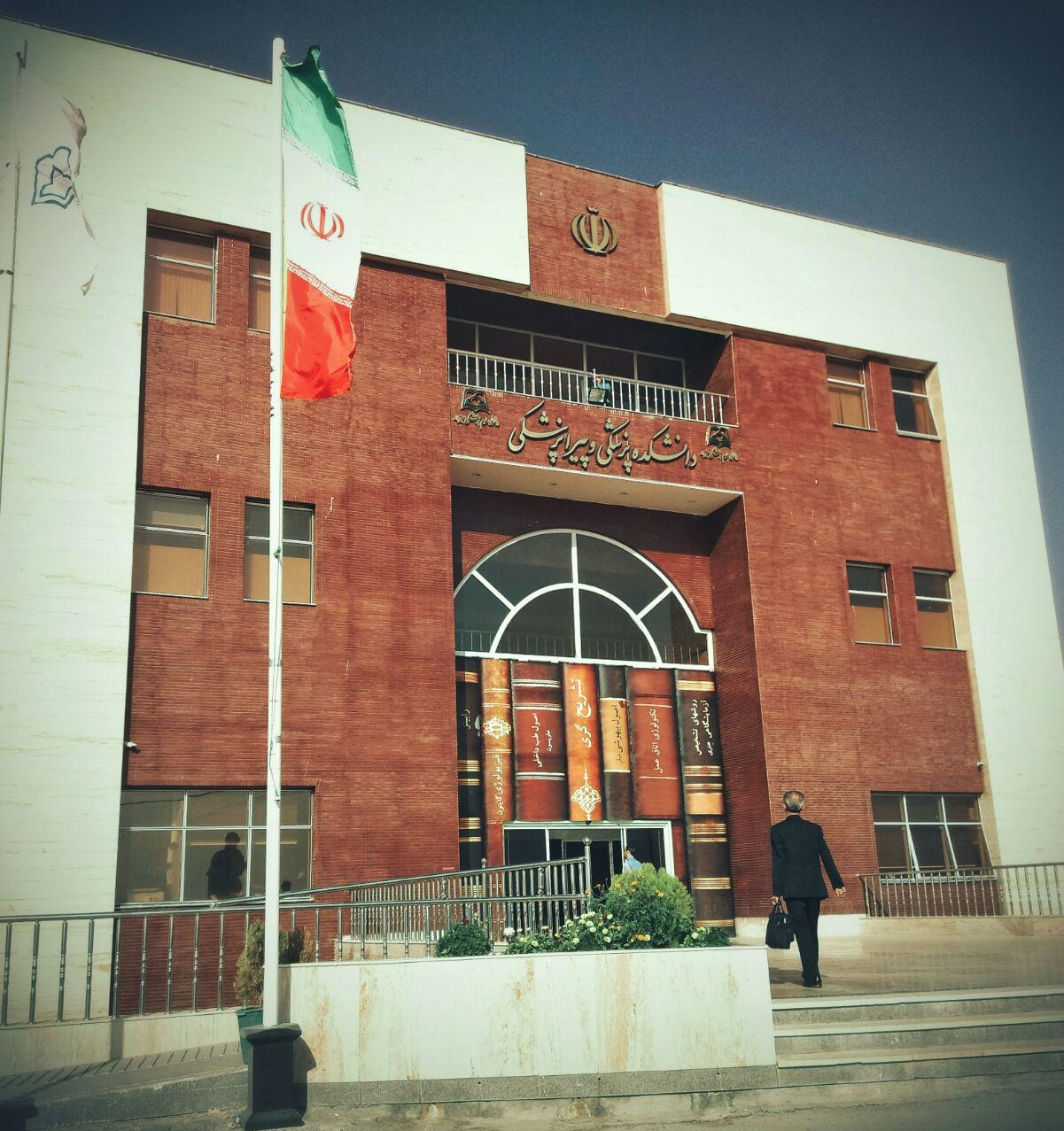
- College Building
- Established: 1986
- Chancellor: Dr. Mohammad Salari Zare
- Administrative staff: 157
- Students: 2000
- Location: Sabzevar, Iran
- Website: medsab.ac.ir

Founded as the school of nursing and midwifery in 1986, Sabzevar University of Medical Sciences, Iran, found its independence from Mashhad University of Medical Sciences in 1995 admitting students for two majors: Nursing (four-year BSC program) and Midwifery (two-year associate degree) with eight faculty members. In 2008, with second round of the presidential visits, three schools of health, paramedical sciences as well as nursing and midwifery, Sabzevar University of Medical Sciences started to admit 20 students for the seven-year major in GP. At the present, the university has five schools of Medicine, Paramedical Sciences, Health, Nursing and midwifery and Jovein Nursing School, admitting students in 21 fields (EMS Associate degree, 14 BSCs, 5 MSCs and 1 MD) covering the education of about 1700 students, with 120 faculty members. Sabzevar University of Medical Sciences enjoys wards of cardiac surgery, radiotherapy, chemotherapy, nuclear medicine; in near future, Heshmatieh Specialty and Super-specialty Hospital will be re-inaugurated to provide more services for the treatment of clients. As of 2015, the university covers five hospitals, 600 beds, 13 EMS sites, five city EMS, 193 rural health centers, 37 urban health center and about 3000 employees.
