= Wajih ad-Din Mas'ud =

Ruler of the Sarbadars from 1338 to 1343

- King
- Reign: 1338-1343
- Predecessor: Abd al-Razzaq ibn Fazlulla
- Successor: Muhammad Aytimur
- Died: 1344
- Dynasty: Sarbadars
- Father: Fadlulla Bashtini
- Religion: Shia Islam

Wajih ad-Din Mas'ud (died 1344) was the leader of the Sarbadars of Sabzewar from 1338 until his death in 1343. Under his rule, the Sarbadar state developed its characteristic dual nature as both a secular and radical Shi'i state.

== Early Reign ==
Mas'ud was the son of Fadlullah Bashtini and the brother of 'Abd al-Razzaq, and was one of 'Abd al-Razzaq's supporters when he seized the city of Sabzewar. During a disagreement with his brother, however, Mas'ud stabbed him to death and assumed his place as leader of the Sarbadars.

Unlike 'Abd al-Razzaq, Mas'ud was a shrewd diplomat and politician. Realizing that he could not maintain his brother's policy of unequivocal hostility towards the master of Khurasan, the Ilkhanid claimant Togha Temur, he secured a peace with Togha Temur's Khurasani supporters and agreed to strike coins in his name. Mas'ud was therefore able to hold Sabzewar unmolested by his more powerful neighbors. During this time of peace, he built up a regular army of cavalry and slave soldiers.

In order to gain more support amongst the Sabzewaris and the people of the neighboring regions, who were mostly Shi'i, Mas'ud decided to align himself with a radical Shi'i cleric, Shaikh Hasan Juri. The Shaikh had a significant following in Sabzewar and would give Mas'ud a significant political advantage. Unfortunately for him, Hasan had been imprisoned by Arghun Shah, the chief of the neighboring Jauni Kurban tribe and a partisan of Togha Temur. Arghun Shah, however, had sent most of his forces to support Togha Temur's campaign against the Chobanids, giving Mas'ud the opportunity to cross through the territory of the Jauni Kurban and free Hasan. When Mas'ud and Hasan returned to Sabzewar, Mas'ud made him co-ruler and had his name inserted before his own in the official prayers. Mas'ud's strategy was successful; Hasan's followers quickly threw their support behind the shaikh. They were quickly organized into a military force along the lines of the futuwa.

== Conflict with Togha Temur ==
In 1340, Mas'ud and Hasan struck against Arghun Shah's Jauni Kurban. Although normally much stronger militarily, most of the Jauni Kurban forces were gone on the campaign against the Chobanids (which was soon to end in failure). In the ensuing battle the Jauni Kurban were defeated and forced to evacuate Nishapur, which the Sarbadars occupied. Mas'ud apparently believed that, as long as he maintained his status as Togha Temur's vassal by sending tribute and keeping the khan's name on the coinage, that the latter would be willing to ignore this attack against Arghun Shah. In 1341 or 1342 however, an army under the command of Togha Temur's brother 'Ali Ke'un was sent to punish the Sarbadars. In the ensuing battle, Togha Temur's forces were routed and 'Ali Ke'un was killed. The remnants of the army, which fled in the direction of Mazandaran, was pursued by the Sarbadars, who killed many of Togha Temur's officials. Jajarm, Damghan, Simnan, and Gurgan were then occupied, and Togha Temur and his personal following fled to Mazandaran.

Mas'ud and Hasan had therefore taken over much of western Khurasan, but their relationship was becoming increasingly strained. Their views on the nature of government were greatly different. Mas'ud feared that Hasan was intent on establishing a radical Shi'i theocracy, with or without Mas'ud's consent. Furthermore, although Sabzewar was largely Shi'i, the recently conquered territories had a majority Sunni population, making Hasan's influence there minimal. Hasan advocated forcibly converting the Sunnis to Shi'ism, which was something that Mas'ud, whose power base consisted of moderate Shi'is and Sunnis, opposed. Mas'ud had also thrown off Togha Temur's suzerainty, but decided to acknowledge the Chobanids instead, since they now shared a border. Coins were struck in the name of the Chobanids' puppet khan Suleiman Khan. Since both the Chobanids and Suleiman were Sunni, Hasan detested this arrangement.

Although a conflict between Mas'ud and Hasan seemed inevitable, they both agreed to lead a campaign against the Kartids of Herat, who were nominally vassals of Togha Temur. The Sarbadars marched on Herat in 1342; they were met by the Kartid malik Mu'izzu'd-Din Husain at Zava and the two sides began to fight. The battle at first seemed to go well for the Sarbadars, but then Hasan Juri was struck down by an assassin, and his followers, suspecting Mas'ud, immediately abandoned the battlefield. Malik Husain was then able to counterattack and defeat Mas'ud. The Sarbadars then had little choice but to abort the campaign.

== Sole Leadership and Death ==
Mas'ud had successfully regained sole control of the Sarbadars, although he had permanently alienated Hasan's dervish organization in the process. The dervishes' hostility to Mas'ud and his supporters would eventually prove fatal to Mas'ud's successors and laid the foundation for several decades of hostility between the secular and religious factions of the state. Mas'ud himself, however, seems to have managed to escape any backlash by Hasan's partisans. Instead, he focused on eliminating Togha Temur once and for all. The khan was still restricted to Mazandaran, so Mas'ud began seeking the support of the local rulers against Togha Temur. Although some pledged their support to him, the Bavandids and Baduspanids both refused to abandon their allegiance to the khan.

Mas'ud thus invaded Mazandaran in 1344 with several hostile minor dynasties allied against him. When the Sarbadars advanced on Amol, the Bavandid Hasan II of Tabaristan decided to abandon the city. He then turned around and defeated the Sarbadar garrison at Sari, cutting off Mas'ud's line of retreat. Despite this, Mas'ud decided to press on. When the Bavandids attacked his rear, however, and the Baduspanid Eskandar II met him at his front, Mas'ud was surrounded. The Sarbadars were decimated, and Mas'ud was captured by the Baduspanids. He was handed over to the son of one of Togha Temur's former officials who had died fighting the Sarbadars in 1341/1342 and executed. Muhammad Aytimur, who Mas'ud had left in charge of Sabzewar before starting the campaign, took control of the Sarbadar state upon Mas'ud's death.

== Notes ==
Preceded by 'Abd al-Razzaq	Head of the Sarbadars; 1338/9–1344	Succeeded by Muhammad Aytimur
