= Sabzevar =

City in Razavi Khorasan province, Iran

Sabzevar Persian: سبزوار
- City
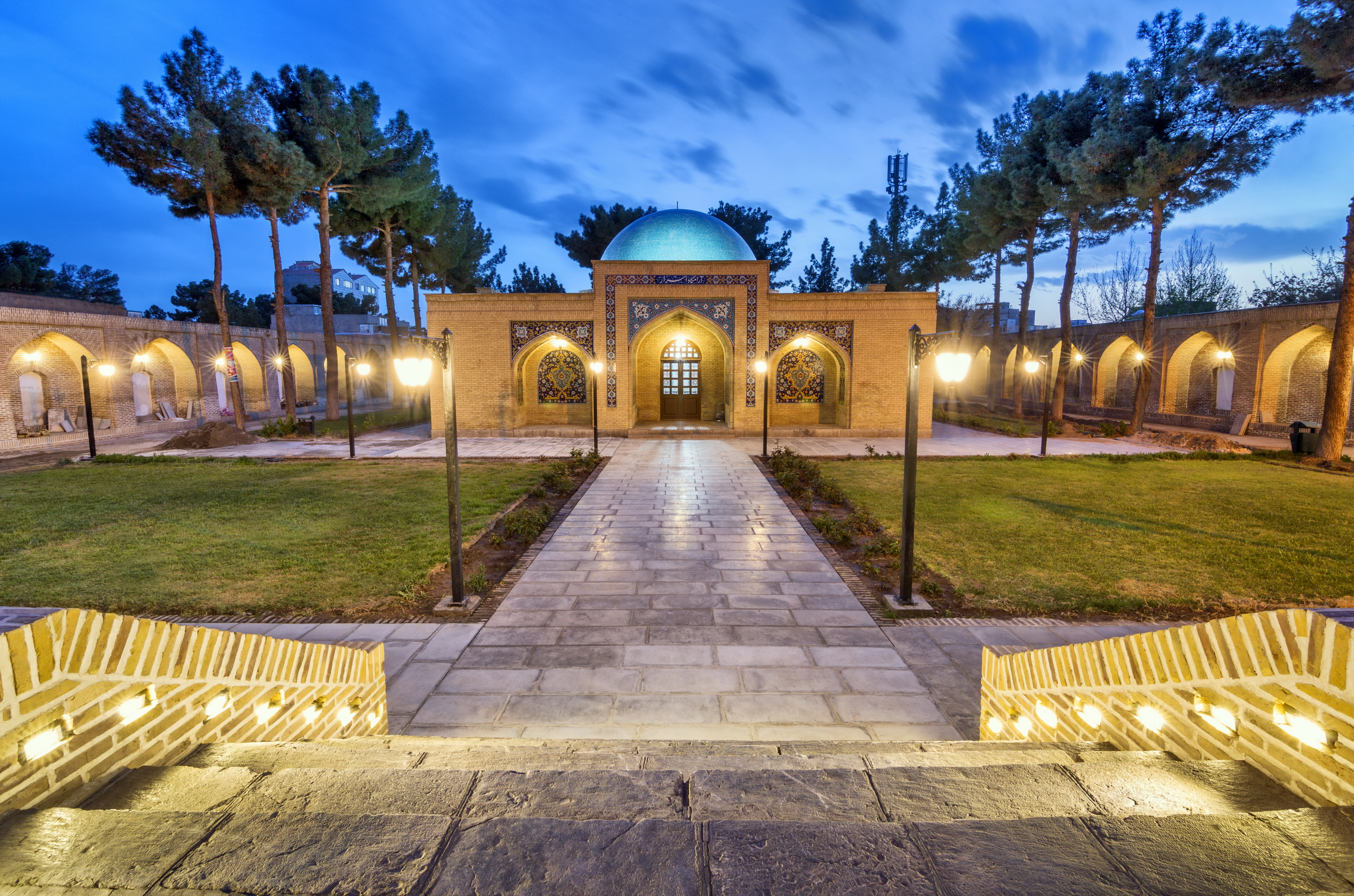
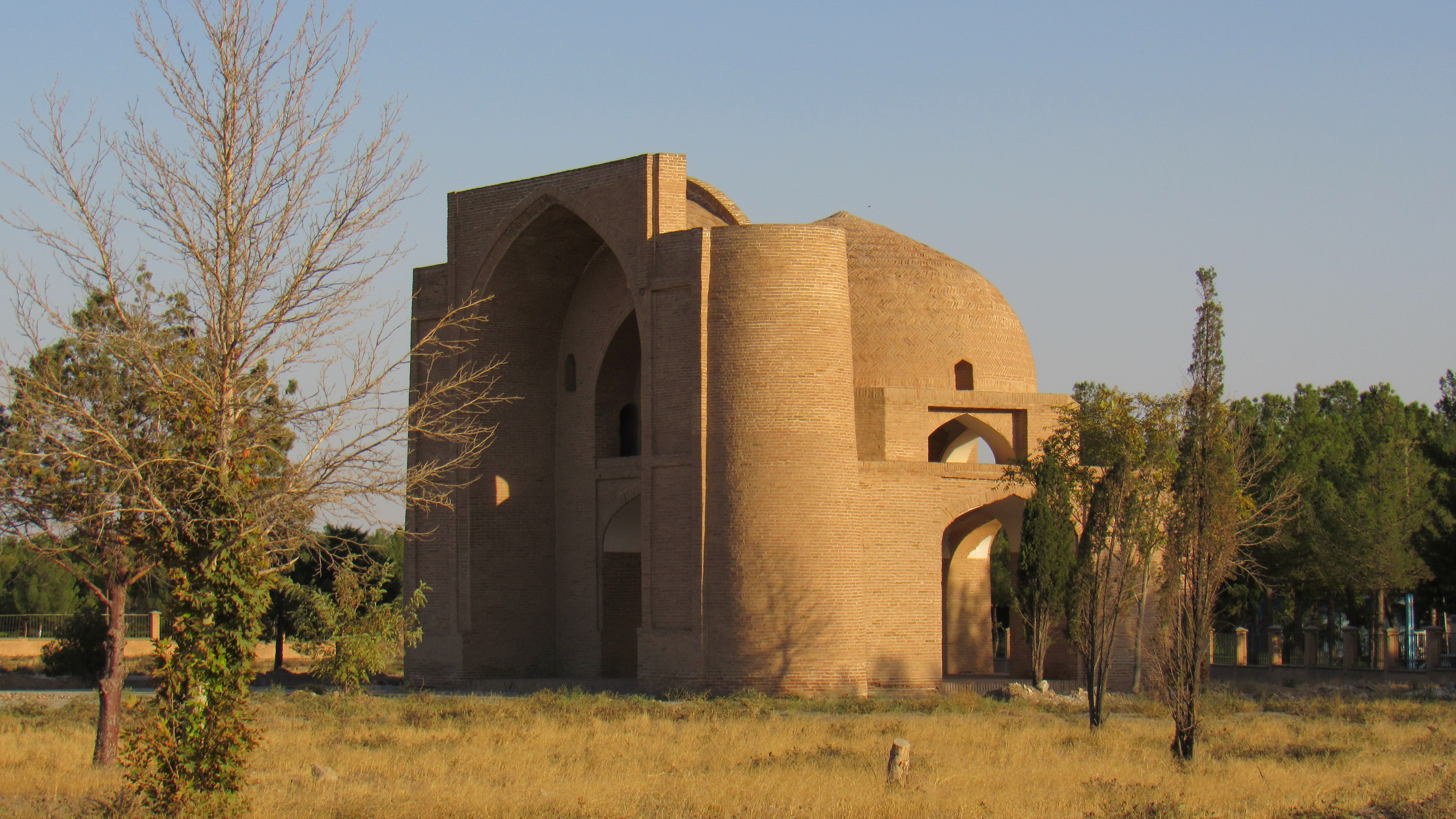
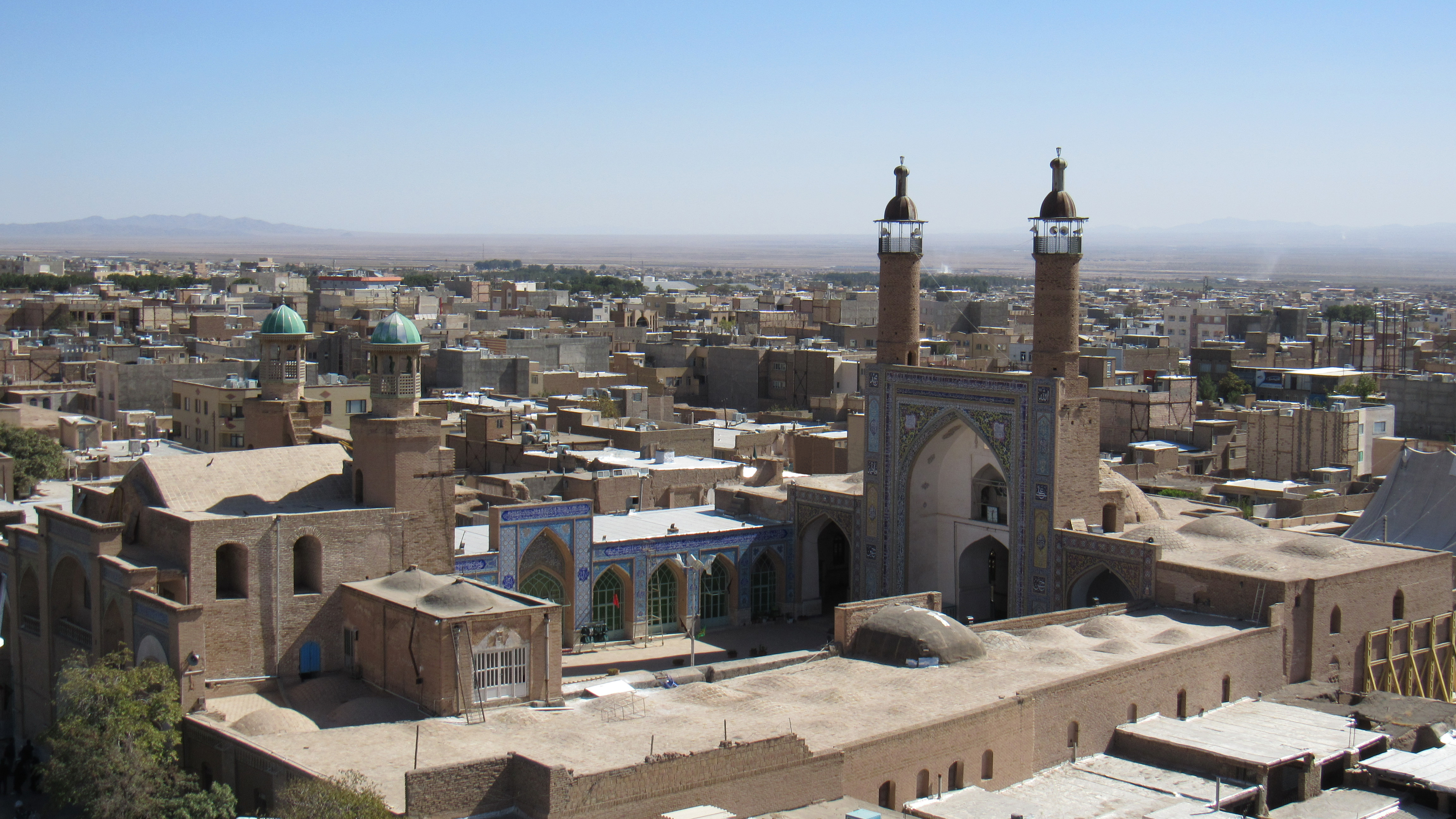
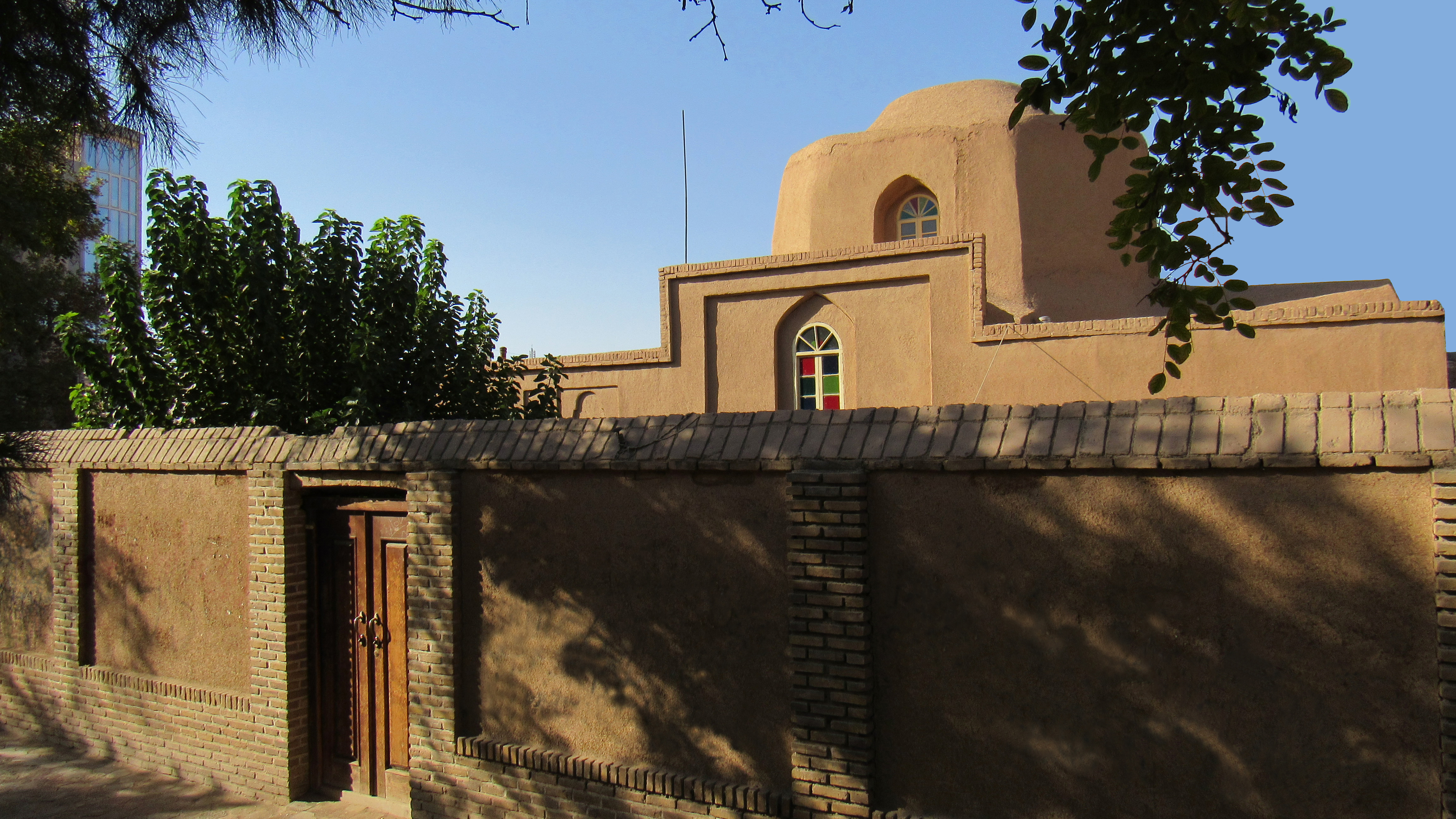
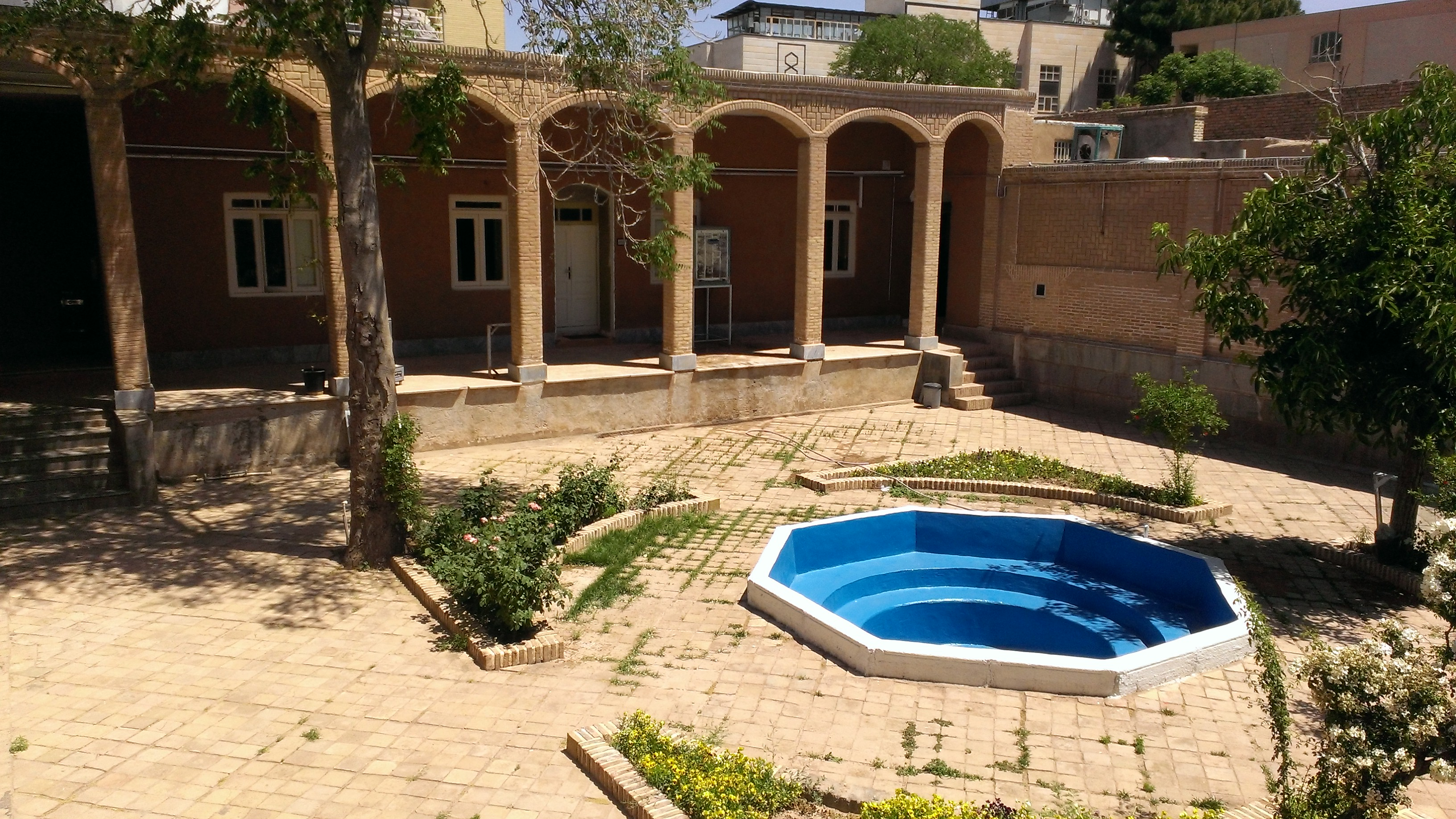
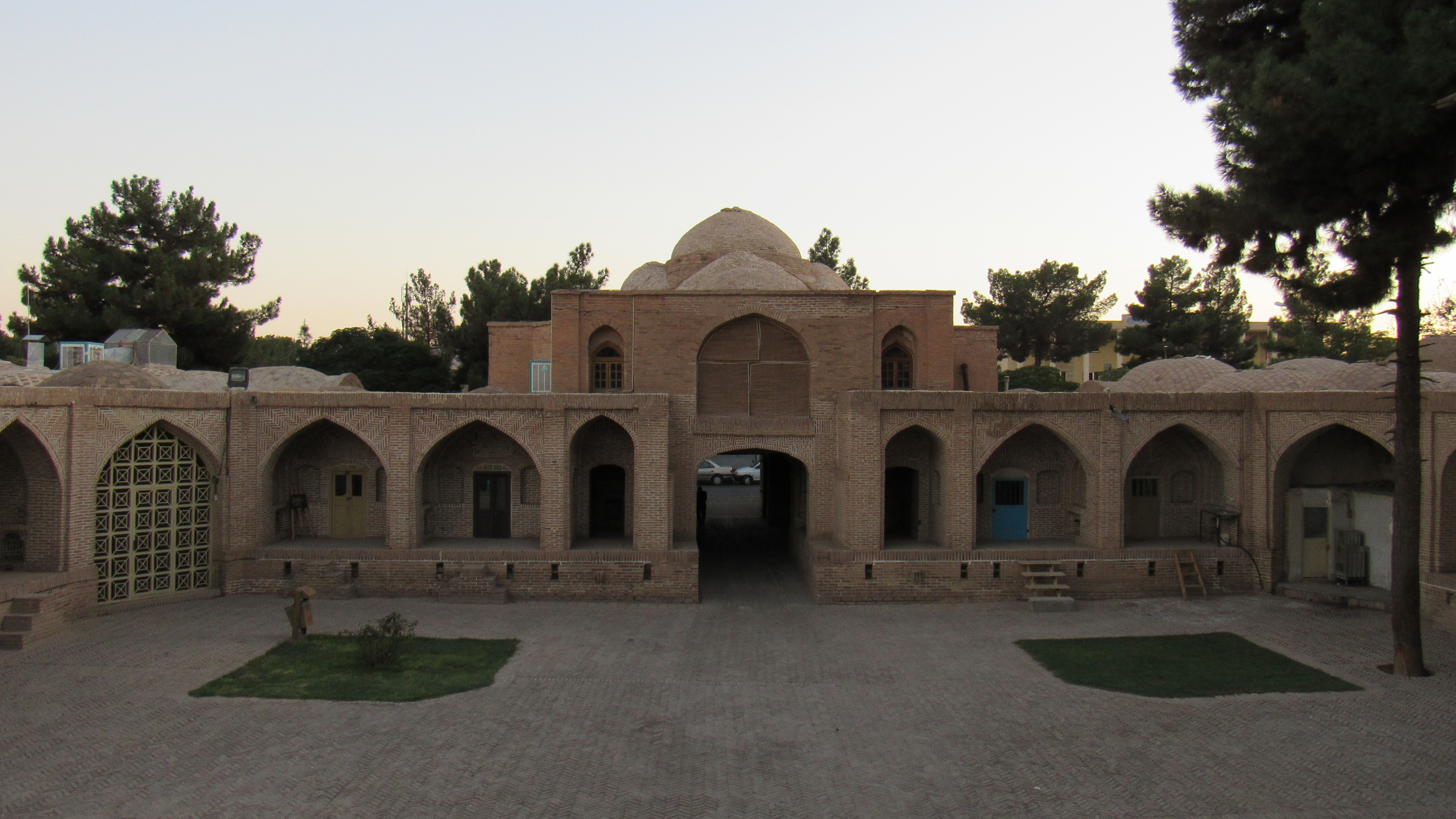
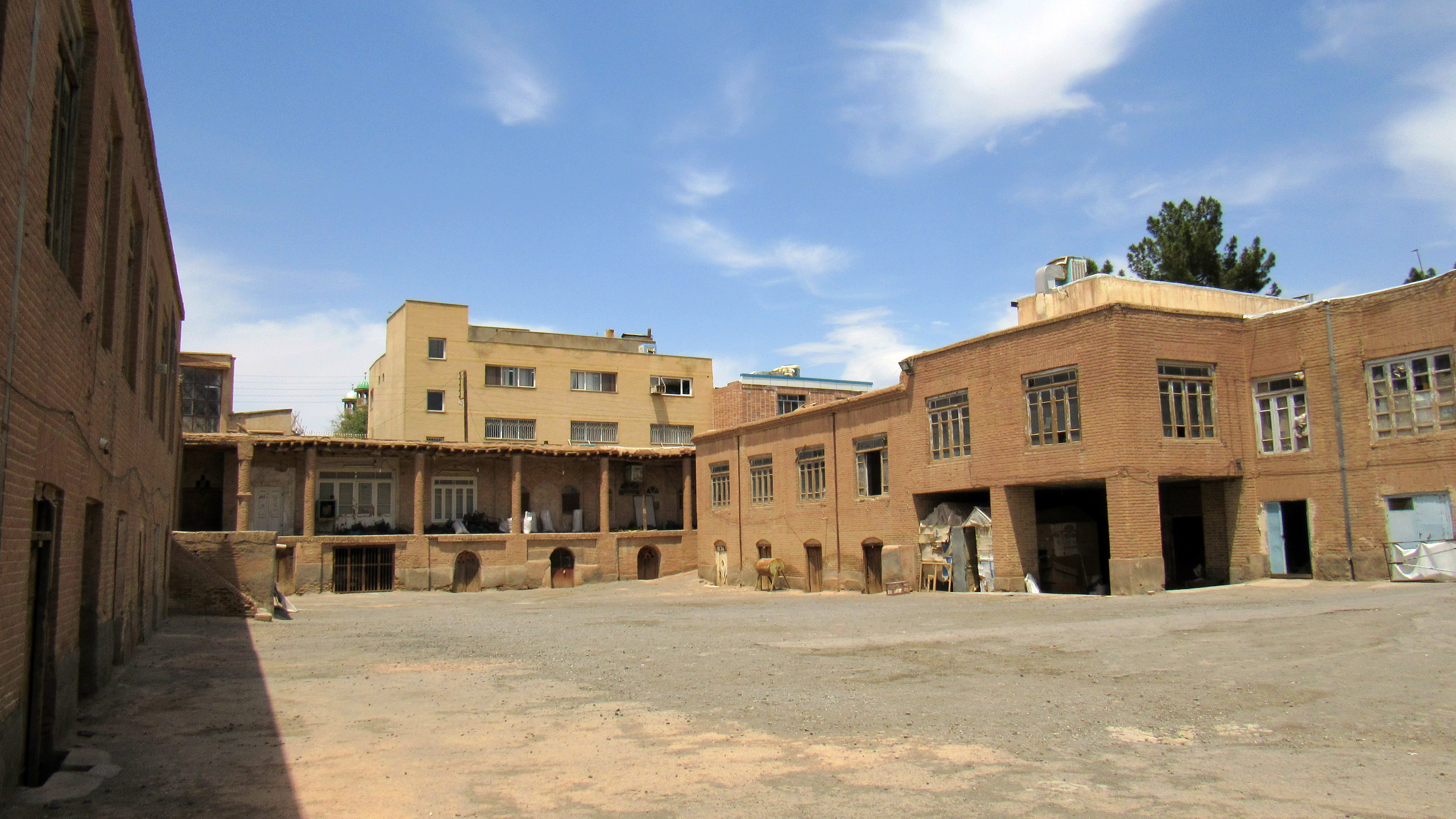
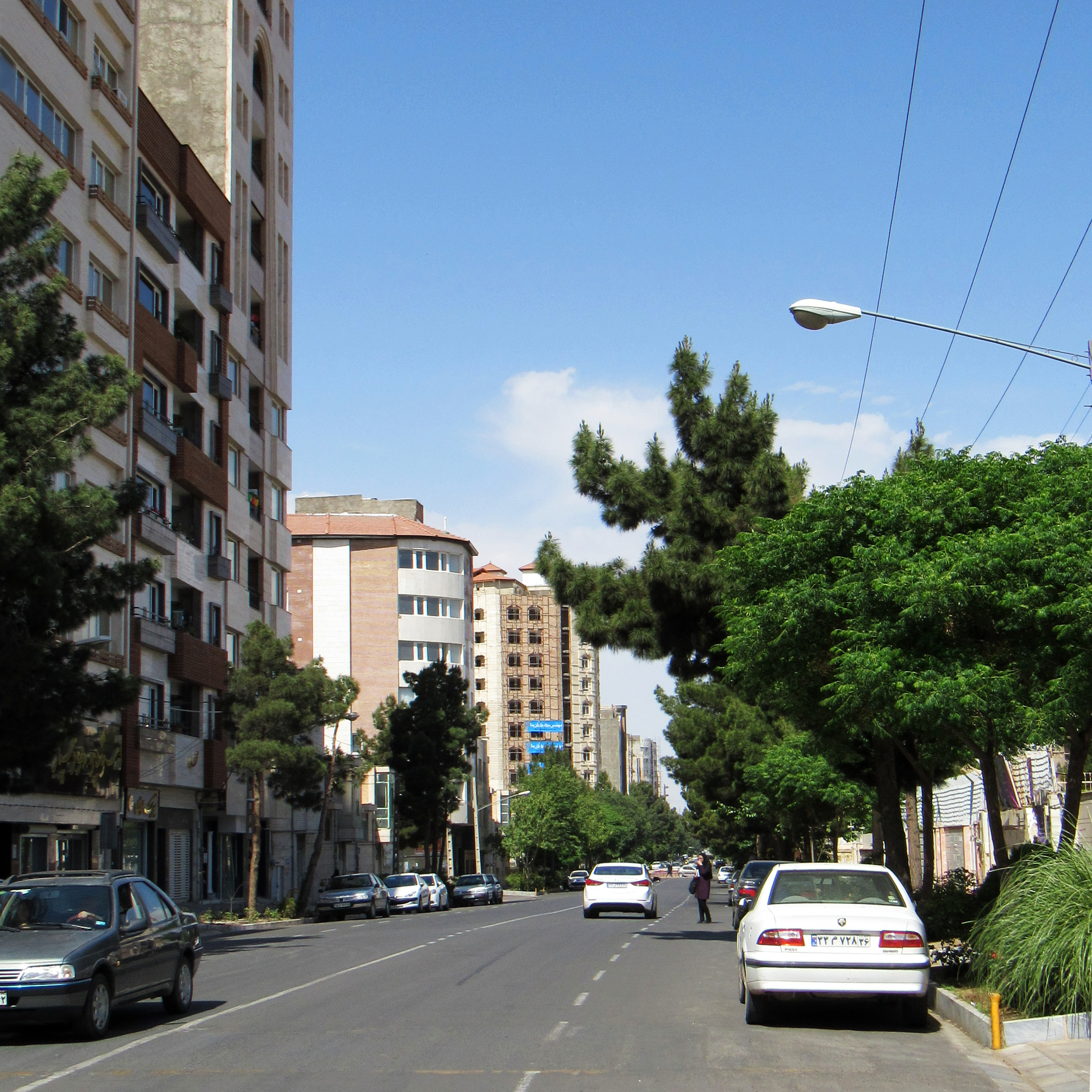

- Location of Sabzevar in Iran
- Coordinates: 36°12′45″N 57°40′35″E
- Country: Iran
- Province: Razavi Khorasan
- County: Sabzevar
- District: Central

Government
  - Mayor: Meysam Hossein Abadi
  - City Council: Chairman: Aminollah Mazloum
- Elevation: 978 m (3,209 ft)

Population (2016)
  - Total: 243,700
  - Population Rank in Iran: 34th
- Time zone: UTC+3:30 (IRST)
- Area code: 051
- Website: www.sabzevar.ir

Sabzevar (Persian: سبزوار;) (Note: Previously known as Beihagh or Beyhagh (بيهق)) is a city in northeastern Iran. It is located in the Central District of Sabzevar County, Razavi Khorasan province, serving as the capital of both the county and the district.

== History ==
The history of Sabzevar goes back to the 1st millennium BC. Ancient remains include fire-temple Azarbarzin which is still visible.

After the Mongol invasion of Iran, the city was the first part of Iran that moved towards its freedom, under the lead of the Sarbedaran movement.

Sabzevar Province had been lost by the Safavids to the Uzbeks of Transoxiana, but was regained following a Safavid counter-offensive around 1600, along with Herat and Farah.

The city suffered a flash flood in April 2020.

== Demographics ==
=== Population ===
In 1937 when Iran was ruled by Reza Shah, Sabzevar was the second most populated city in the 9th county. According to the census of 2017, Sabzevar is Iran's 34th most populous city.

At the time of the 2006 National Census, the city's population was 208,172 in 57,024 households. The following census in 2011 counted 231,557 people in 70,422 households. The 2016 census measured the population of the city as 243,700 people in 74,757 households.

== Geography ==
=== Location ===
Sabzevar is in the west of Razavi Khorasan province, approximately 220 kilometers (140 mi) west of the provincial capital, Mashhad, in the northeastern part of the country. Sabzevar is a 650 km from Tehran (the capital of Iran).

Notable neighboring settlements include Nishapur, Bardaskan, Esfarāyen and Shahrud.

=== Climate ===
Sabzevar has a cool semi-arid climate (Köppen: BSk), though bordering upon both a cool arid climate (BWk) and a hot semi-arid climate (BSh). Summers are sweltering and virtually rainless, whilst winters are cool with occasional, though generally light, showers.

Climate data for Sabzevar (1991–2020, extremes 1981–2020) (Note: Rainy days calculated using parameter codes 46, 69 and 71 from the first source)
Month	Jan	Feb	Mar	Apr	May	Jun	Jul	Aug	Sep	Oct	Nov	Dec	Year
Record high °C (°F)	21.0 (69.8)	29.7 (85.5)	34.8 (94.6)	37.8 (100.0)	41.0 (105.8)	44.4 (111.9)	45.5 (113.9)	46.0 (114.8)	41.8 (107.2)	37.5 (99.5)	30.4 (86.7)	23.0 (73.4)	46.0 (114.8)
Mean daily maximum °C (°F)	10.0 (50.0)	13.0 (55.4)	18.4 (65.1)	25.3 (77.5)	31.3 (88.3)	36.5 (97.7)	38.2 (100.8)	36.9 (98.4)	33.2 (91.8)	26.5 (79.7)	18.0 (64.4)	12.0 (53.6)	24.9 (76.9)
Daily mean °C (°F)	4.2 (39.6)	6.7 (44.1)	11.8 (53.2)	18.1 (64.6)	24.0 (75.2)	29.3 (84.7)	31.2 (88.2)	29.5 (85.1)	25.2 (77.4)	18.4 (65.1)	11.0 (51.8)	6.0 (42.8)	18.0 (64.3)
Mean daily minimum °C (°F)	0.1 (32.2)	2.0 (35.6)	6.5 (43.7)	12.0 (53.6)	17.3 (63.1)	22.4 (72.3)	24.6 (76.3)	22.5 (72.5)	18.2 (64.8)	12.2 (54.0)	6.1 (43.0)	1.9 (35.4)	12.2 (53.9)
Record low °C (°F)	−18.6 (−1.5)	−20.8 (−5.4)	−7.2 (19.0)	−2.0 (28.4)	4.0 (39.2)	10.2 (50.4)	16.0 (60.8)	11.9 (53.4)	7.0 (44.6)	−1.4 (29.5)	−8.0 (17.6)	−11.7 (10.9)	−20.8 (−5.4)
Average precipitation mm (inches)	26.2 (1.03)	29.2 (1.15)	37.5 (1.48)	29.3 (1.15)	15.5 (0.61)	4.3 (0.17)	0.6 (0.02)	0.3 (0.01)	1.3 (0.05)	5.4 (0.21)	16.0 (0.63)	20.2 (0.80)	185.8 (7.31)
Average snowfall cm (inches)	12.1 (4.8)	4.8 (1.9)	0.6 (0.2)	0.0 (0.0)	0.0 (0.0)	0.0 (0.0)	0.0 (0.0)	0.0 (0.0)	0.0 (0.0)	0.0 (0.0)	0.0 (0.0)	1.5 (0.6)	19 (7.5)
Average precipitation days (≥ 1.0 mm)	4.5	4.5	5.6	4.3	2.7	0.6	0.1	0.1	0.4	1.0	2.7	3.7	30.2
Average rainy days	6.5	7.0	8.6	6.6	4.1	0.9	0.5	0.3	0.4	2.1	5.1	5.5	47.6
Average snowy days	3.2	1.7	0.7	0.0	0.0	0.0	0.0	0.0	0.0	0.0	0.0	0.9	6.5
Average relative humidity (%)	61	55	50	43	33	24	21	21	24	33	48	60	39
Average dew point °C (°F)	−3.3 (26.1)	−2.5 (27.5)	0.2 (32.4)	3.4 (38.1)	4.5 (40.1)	4.6 (40.3)	5.1 (41.2)	3.4 (38.1)	1.7 (35.1)	0.5 (32.9)	−0.8 (30.6)	−2.1 (28.2)	1.2 (34.2)
Mean monthly sunshine hours	181	184	209	242	296	339	358	356	310	273	206	178	3,132
Source: ncei.noaa (snowfall and snow/sleet days 1981-2010)

Climate data for Sabzevar
Month	Jan	Feb	Mar	Apr	May	Jun	Jul	Aug	Sep	Oct	Nov	Dec	Year
Mean No. of days with Maximum temperature => 30.0 °C (86.0 °F)	0	0	0.4	5.7	20.5	29.2	31.0	30.7	24.7	6.8	0.1	0	149.1
Mean No. of days with Maximum temperature => 40.0 °C (104.0 °F)	0	0	0	0	0.2	4.1	8.5	4.1	0.4	0	0	0	17.3
Mean No. of days with Minimum temperature < 0.0 °C (32.0 °F)	15.0	8.1	2.4	0.1	0	0	0	0	0	0	2.2	8.8	36.8
Mean No. of days with Maximum temperature <= 0.0 °C (32.0 °F)	0.8	0.3	0	0	0	0	0	0	0	0	0	0	1.1
Mean No. of days with snow depth => 0 cm (0 in)	2.6	0.9	0.2	0	0	0	0	0	0	0	0	0.1	5.4
Mean number of days with thunder	0.1	0.5	1.0	1.9	2.9	0.8	0.3	0.3	0.2	0.3	0.2	0.1	8.6
Mean number of days with dust	0.2	0.6	2.3	2.4	2.6	3	2.2	1.2	1.4	1.2	0.8	0.1	18
Mean number of days with haze/smoke	1.9	1.4	2.4	2.1	1.5	1.0	0.3	0.6	0.6	1	2.2	2.5	17.5
Mean number of days with fog/ice fog	0.4	0.1	0	0.1	0	0	0	0	0	0	0.1	0.4	1.1
Number of days with no sunshine	3.2	1.4	2.2	0.8	0.2	0	0	0	0	0.2	1.4	2.6	12

== Economy ==
Sabzevar is the commercial center for an agricultural region producing grapes and raisins. There is some small-scale industry, for food processing, copperware, and electric motors. Through the old bazaar of Sabzevar fresh, dried, and preserved fruits and vegetables are exported. Sabzevar is connected to Tehran and Mashhad by road. Sabzevar Airport provides domestic flights.

== Anthem ==
The special Anthem of Sabzevar was unveiled for the first time in 2010; it received the first rank in all anthems of cities in Razavi Khorasan province.

== Main sights ==
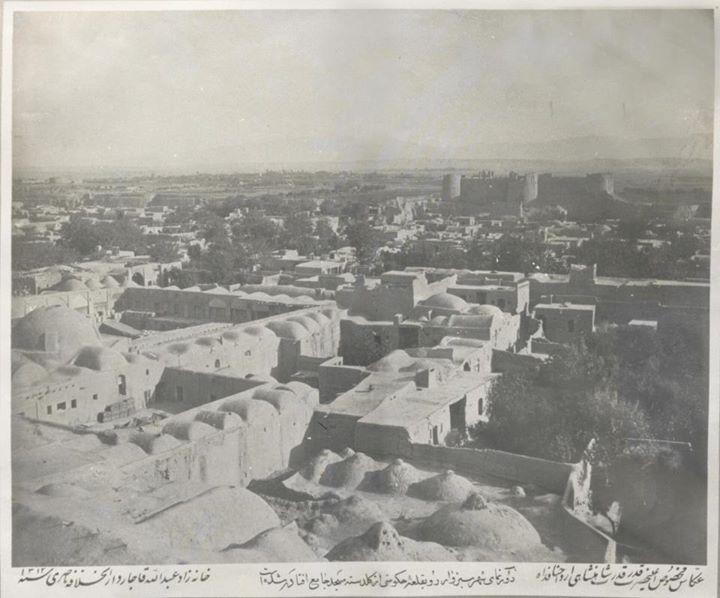
Sabzevar 1933

Mil-e Khosrow Gerd (meaning "The brick tower of king Khosrau) is the highest brick tower in the city. Mosques include the Masjed Jameh of Friday mosque, with its two tall minarets. They were both built during the Islamic age of Sabzevar.

== Universities ==
Hakim Sabzevari University is one of the most prestigious public universities in Iran and the oldest university in Sabzevar. HSU was established in 1973 as Kar University. After the Iranian revolution in 1979, the university was suspended until 1987. HSU was reestablished with a new name. The Tarbiat Moallem University of Sabzevar has grown steadily until 2011, when it was renamed to Hakim Sabzevari University. HSU offers 139 bachelors, masters, and Ph.D. programs to more than 9,200 male and female students studying under about 280 faculty members in 10 departments. HSU is known as the dynamic in science and the leading in development university in Iran.

Sabzevar University of Medical Sciences is one of the most prestigious public universities in Khorasan province. MEDSAB was established in 1975. In 1986, School of nursing was founded in Sabzevar. MEDSAB offers 20 programs to more than 2000 students in medical fields. This university has more than 200 faculty members. There are 5 hospitals and 4 schools in this university.

The city is home to the Islamic Azad University of Sabzevar (IAUS), founded in 1985 in response to increasing demands for a higher education center in the region; expansion and development have always continued within the university. IAUS is one of the most private universities in Khorasan province. Currently, there are about 6,500 students studying in three campuses.

Sabzevar University of New Technology is the youngest public university in Khorasan province. SUNT was established in 2011. The main objective of this university on teaching and transferring new technology for women students. SUNT offers modern bachelors programs to more than 1000 female students studying in one department. SUNT is known as the third generation universities in Iran.

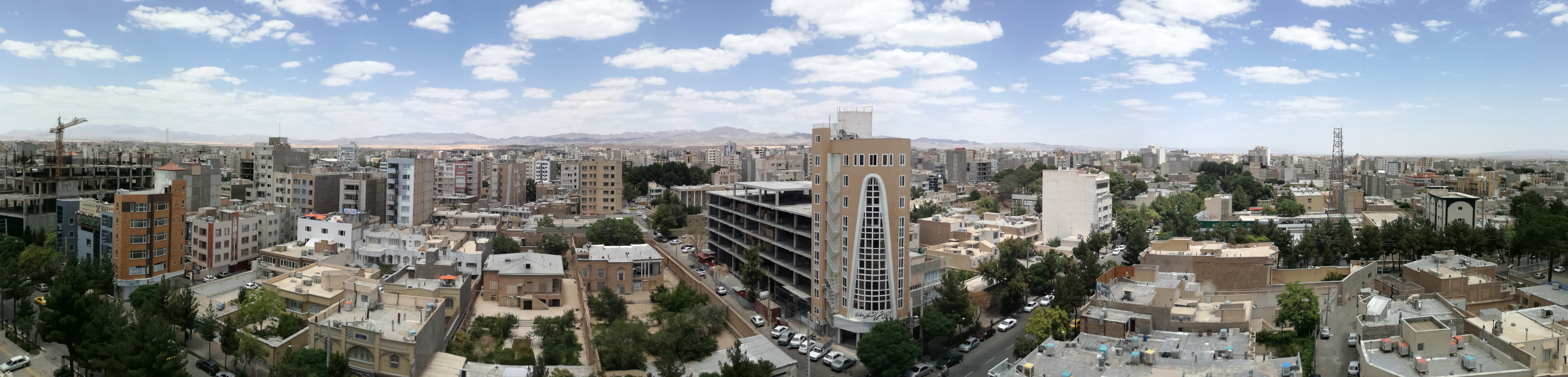
North of Hashshmandi Sabzevar Hospital

== Historical places ==
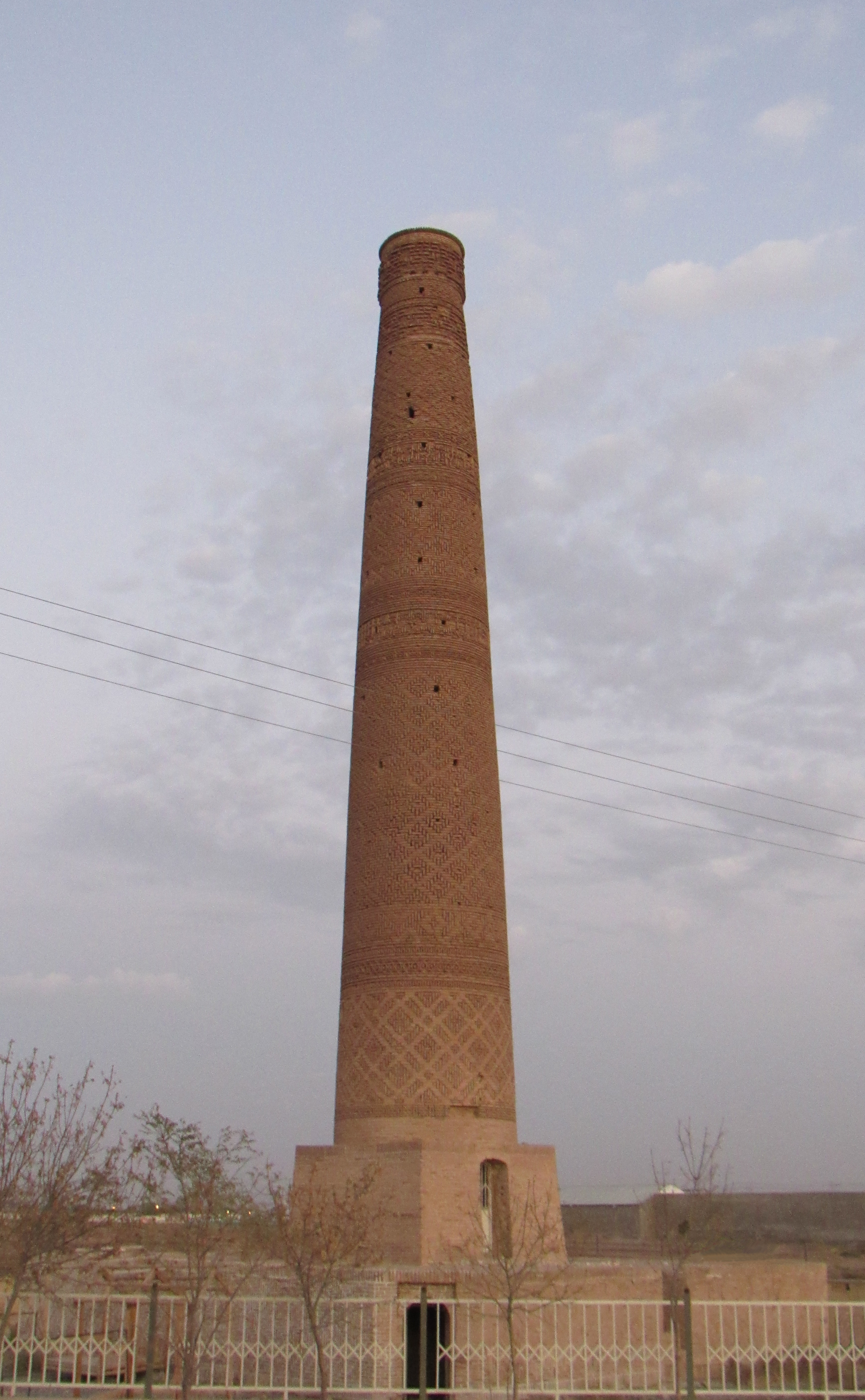
Minaret Khosrowud

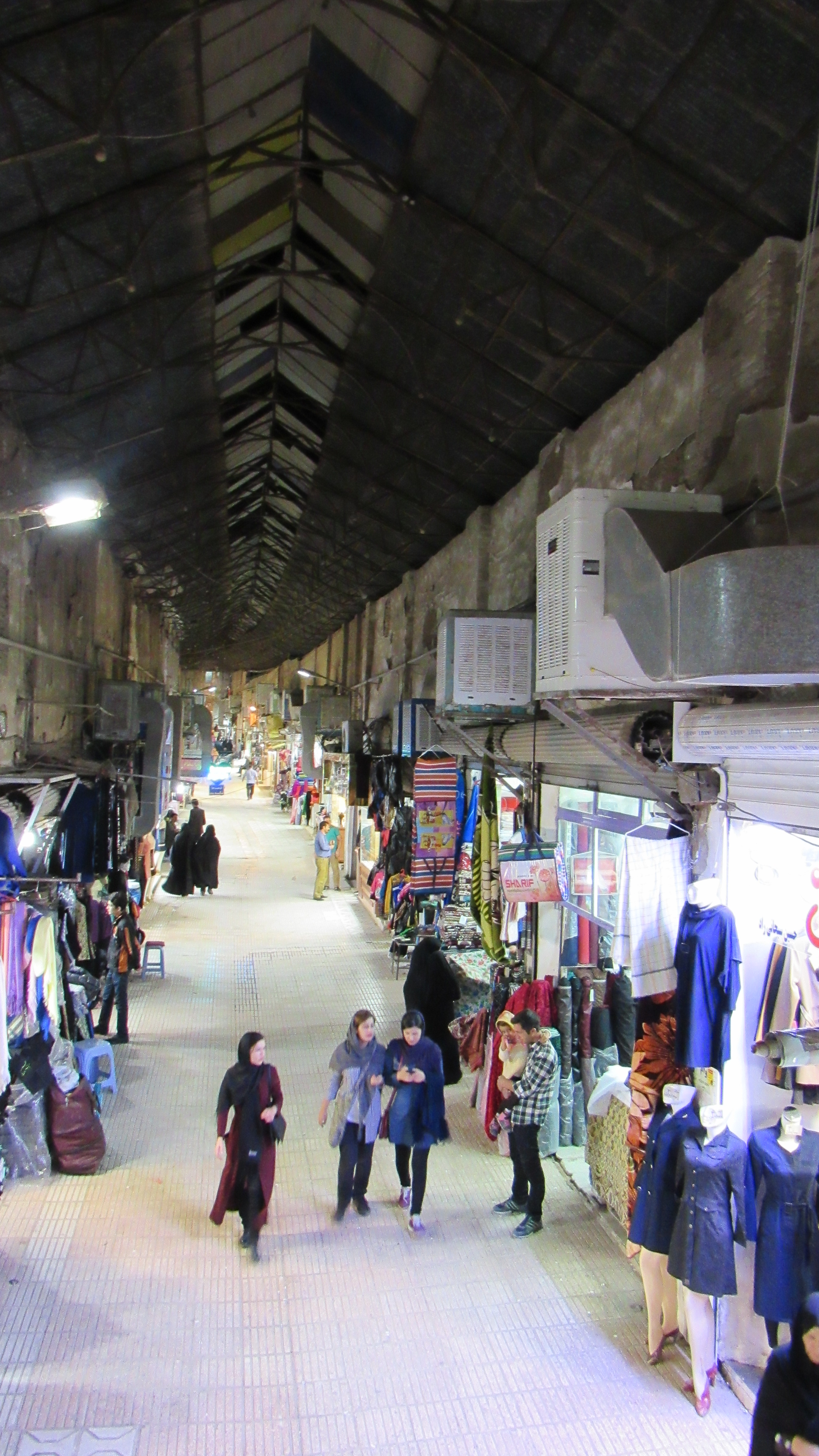
Sabzevar Historical Market

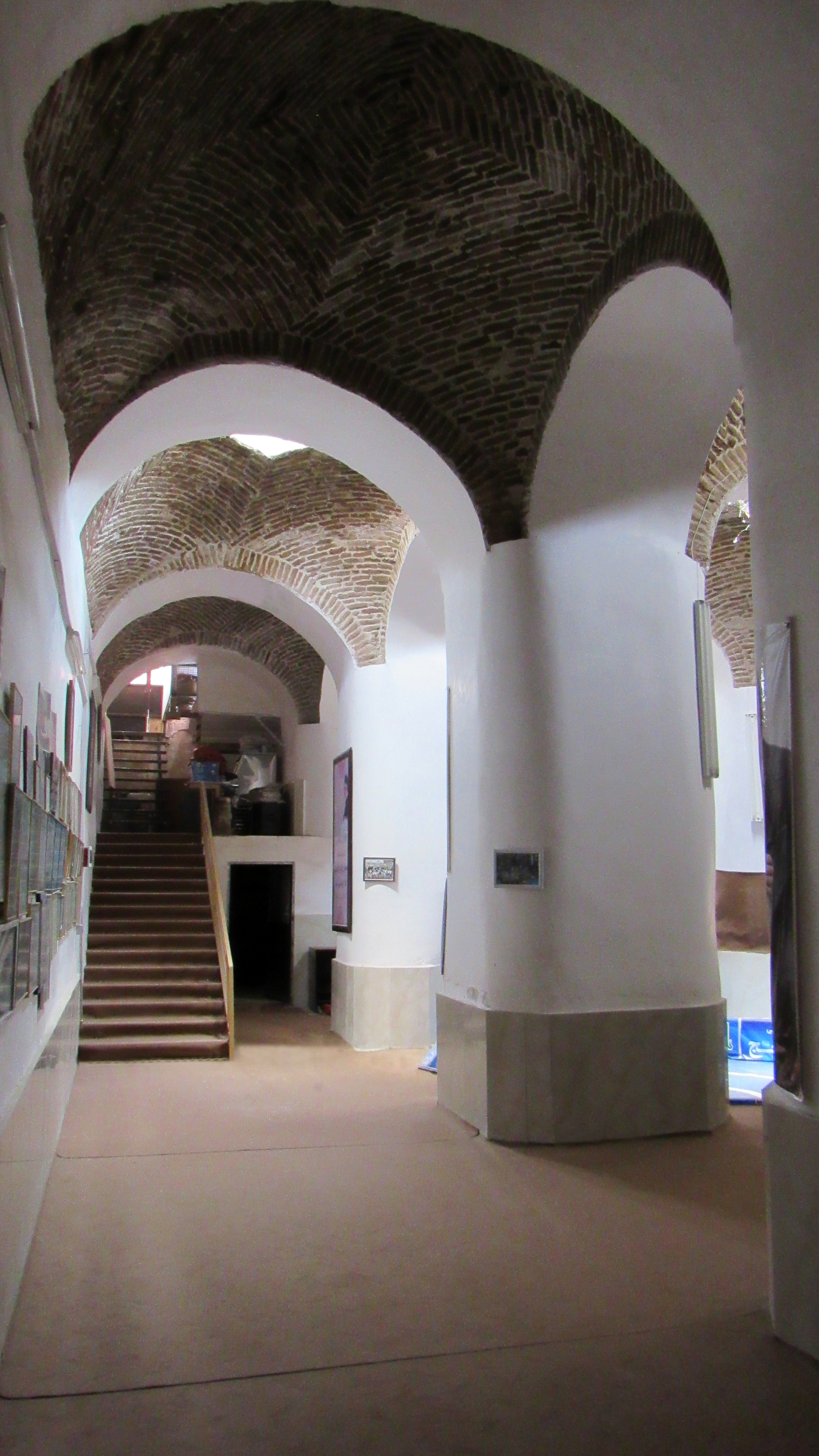
pool with eight bases

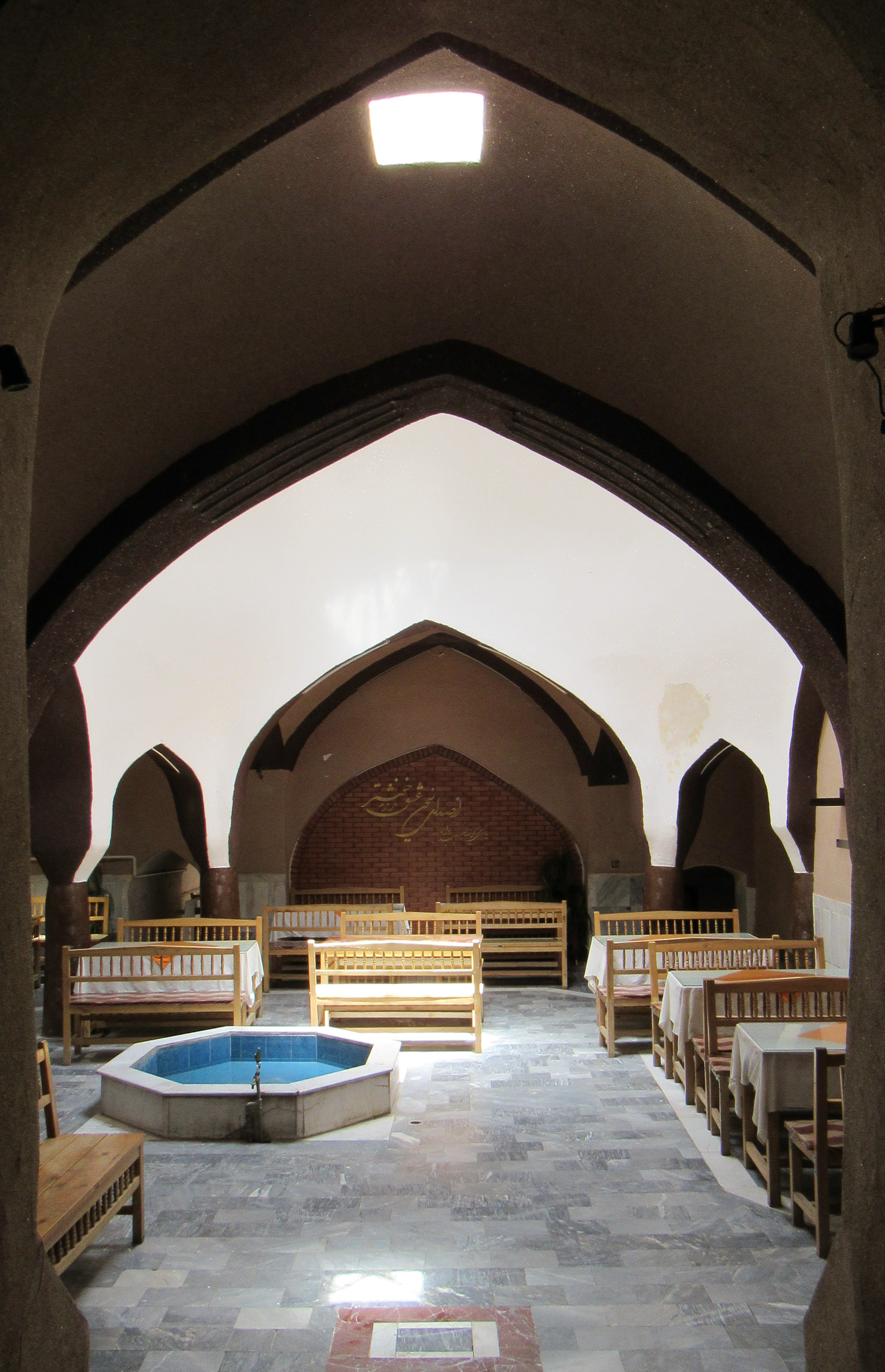
Caesarea Bath

== Notable people ==
- Ali Shariati
- Mahmoud Dowlatabadi
- Hadi Sabzavari
- Al-Bayhaqi
- Husayn Kashifi
- Abul-Fazl Bayhaqi
- Ali Divandari
- Ali-Akbar Furutan
- Rouzbeh Cheshmi
- Sayed Hassan Amin
- Mohammad Khordadian
- Mirza Muhammad Kamil Dehlavi
- Behzad Nabavi
- Mahmoud Anbarani
- Abd al-A'la al-Sabzevari
- Abu'l-Fadl Bayhaqi
- Rezai family
- Cyrus Ghani
- Amir Shahi Sabzavari
- Mohammad Khorramgah
- Mohammad Parvin Gonabadi
- Mohammad Bagher Sabzevari
- Fakhreddin Hejazi
- Mohammad Salari
- Kulū Isfandiyār
- Mohammad-Reza Rahchamani
- Arash Sobhani
- Ali Salehabadi
- Habib Rezaei
- Iraj Mehdian
- Mohammadreza Davarzani
- Mohammad Hashem Mirza Afsar
- Hasan Reyvandi
- Hedayat Hashemi
- Saeed Soltampour
- Hamid Sabzevari
- Gholam-Ali Beski
- Hossein Torabi
- Hassan Lahooti
- Ghasem Ghani
- Hossein Golestani

== Transportation ==
Sabzevar is located on the country's transportation highway and passes through roads 44, 87 and the freeway under construction from shrine to shrine. Also, the Turkmenistan-Quchan-Sabzevar transit highway leads from Sabzevar to other parts of the country. It was known as the permitted air border and was operational 24 hours a day.

=== Airport ===
Sabzevar Airport was opened in 2003 and now has international flights and is the only airport in Khorasan Razavi that transports passengers after Mashhad Airport. The airport, which had previously experienced foreign flights to Damascus and Baghdad in the 1990s and 1990s, now operates direct flights back and forth to Tehran and Kish Island two days a week.

== See also ==
- Razavi Khorasan

Media related to Sabzevar at Wikimedia Commons
