= Bavandid family tree =

This is a family tree of the Bavandid rulers, and their ancestors.

== Family Tree ==
Bawi
Shapur
Vinduyih	Vistahm
Farrukh Hormizd	Tiruyih	Vinduyih
Rostam Farrokhzad	Farrukhzad
Shahram	Surkhab I	Isfandyadh	Bahram	Farrukhan
Mihr Mardan
Surkhab II
Sharwin I
Qarin
Shahriyar I
Shapur	Ja'far	Qarin I
Maziar	Surkhab
Rustam I
Sharwin II
Shahriyar II	Rustam II	Unnamed princess
Dara	al-Marzuban	Sharwin III
Shahriyar III	Rustam Dushmanziyar	Sayyida Shirin
Surkhab
Qarin II
Shahriyar IV
Qarin III	Ali I	Rustam	Yazdagird	Bahram
Rustam III	Faramurz
Taj al-Muluk Mardavij	Shah Ghazi Rustam
Hasan I
Ardashir I
Sharaf al-Muluk	Sharaf al-Dawla	Rustam V	Unnamed princess	Rukn al-Dawla Qarin
Shahriyar
Kinkhwar
Shahriyar	Ardashir II
Yazdagird
Muhammad	Ali II
Shahriyar V	Shah-Kaykhusraw	Shams al-Muluk Muhammad
Hasan II	Sharaf al-Muluk
Unnamed son

== See also ==
- Sasanian family tree

== Sources ==
- Bosworth, C. E. (1968). "The Political and Dynastic History of the Iranian World (A.D. 1000–1217)". In Frye, R. N. (ed.). The Cambridge History of Iran, Volume 5: The Saljuq and Mongol periods. Cambridge: Cambridge University Press. pp. 1–202. ISBN 0-521-06936-X.
- Frye, R. N. (1986). "Bāwand". The Encyclopedia of Islam, New Edition, Volume I: A–B. Leiden and New York: BRILL. p. 1110. ISBN 90-04-08114-3.
- Madelung, W. (1975). "The Minor Dynasties of Northern Iran". In Frye, R. N. (ed.). The Cambridge History of Iran, Volume 4: From the Arab Invasion to the Saljuqs. Cambridge: Cambridge University Press. pp. 198–249. ISBN 978-0-521-20093-6.
- Madelung, W. (1984). "ĀL-E BĀVAND (BAVANDIDS)". Encyclopaedia Iranica, Vol. I, Fasc. 7. London u.a.: Routledge & Kegan Paul. pp. 747–753. ISBN 90-04-08114-3.
- Pourshariati, Parvaneh (2008). Decline and Fall of the Sasanian Empire: The Sasanian-Parthian Confederacy and the Arab Conquest of Iran. London and New York: I.B. Tauris. ISBN 978-1-84511-645-3.
