= Kai Ka'us I (Paduspanid ruler) =

Kai Ka'us I (Persian: كيكاوس), was the ruler of the Paduspanid dynasty from 1168 to 1184. He was the brother and successor of Shahrivash.

== Biography ==
Kai Ka'us was the son of Hazarasp I. During his youth, he fled for unknown reasons from his brother Shahrivash, and began serving the Bavandid ruler Shah Ghazi Rustam IV. Kai Ka'us quickly rose into high ranks, and after the death of Shah Ghazi Rustam's vassal Kiya Buzurg in 1156, he was appointed as the successor of the latter. After the death of Shahrivash in 1168, Kai Ka'us quickly took the opportunity to invade Paduspanid territory, where he defeated a prince named Namavar ibn Bisutun, and crowned himself as the ruler of the Paduspanid dynasty. However, after having gained control of his family's domains, Kai Ka'us, along with a local ruler named Fakhr al-Dawla Garshasp, revolted against Shah Ghazi Rustam's successor Hasan I. Hasan I shortly sent an army against the latter, which was, however, defeated by Kai Ka'us.

Hasan I then himself invaded the domains of Kai Ka'us, and captured him. However, Hasan I chose to pardon Kai Ka'us. Hasan I later died in 1173, and was succeeded by his son Ardashir I. Ardashir I later took Kai Ka'us' domains, and ordered his general Mubariz al-Din Arjasf to attack Kai Ka'us. Sometime later, Kai Ka'us' son Justan died, and only his 1-year-old grandson Zarrinkamar survived, whom Ardashir I agreed to raise and make ruler of the Paduspanid dynasty when the latter had grown up. Kai Ka'us shortly died in 1184. After his death, the nobles of the Paduspanid capital of Ruyan made his nephew Hazarasp II the new ruler of the dynasty.

== Sources ==
- Madelung, W. (2010). "BADUSPANIDS". Encyclopaedia Iranica, Online Edition.
- Frye, R.N. (1975). "The Saljuq and Mongol periods". In Frye, R.N. (ed.). The Cambridge History of Iran, Volume 5: The Iranian world. Cambridge: Cambridge University Press. pp. 1–659. ISBN 0-521-20093-8.

Preceded by Shahrivash	Paduspanid ruler 1168–1184	Succeeded by Hazarasp II
