= Shahrivash =

Ruler of the Paduspanids from 1117 to 1168

Shahrivash (Persian: شهریوَش), also known as Shahrnush (Persian: شهرنوش), was the ruler of the Paduspanid dynasty from 1117 to 1168. He was the son and successor of Hazarasp I.

== Biography ==
In 1140, the Seljuq Sultan Ahmad Sanjar sent an army under Abbas, the amir of Ray, to invade Mazandaran and conquer the domains of his vassal, the Bavandid ruler Ali I. Abbas captured Amol, and several minor rulers of Mazandaran submitted to him, but Ali I urged Shahrivash not to submit to the latter. After some time, Ali made peace with Abbas. In 1142, Ali was succeeded by his son Shah Ghazi Rustam IV, but was shortly challenged by his brother Taj al-Muluk Mardavij, who was supported by Ahmad Sanjar and Shahrivash. However, Shahrivash later changed sides, supporting Shah Ghazi Rustam IV. Shah Ghazi Rustam IV rewarded Shahrivash by giving him his daughter (or sister), as well as the two cities Natal and Paydasht. Shahrivash died in 1168, and was succeeded by his brother Kai Ka'us I.

== Sources ==
- Madelung, W. (2010). "BADUSPANIDS". Encyclopaedia Iranica, Online Edition.
- Frye, R.N. (1975). "The Saljuq and Mongol periods". In Frye, R.N. (ed.). The Cambridge History of Iran, Volume 5: The Iranian world. Cambridge: Cambridge University Press. pp. 1–659. ISBN 0-521-20093-8.

Preceded by Hazarasp I	Paduspanid ruler 1117–1168	Succeeded by Kai Ka'us I
