= Shahriyar ibn Abbas =

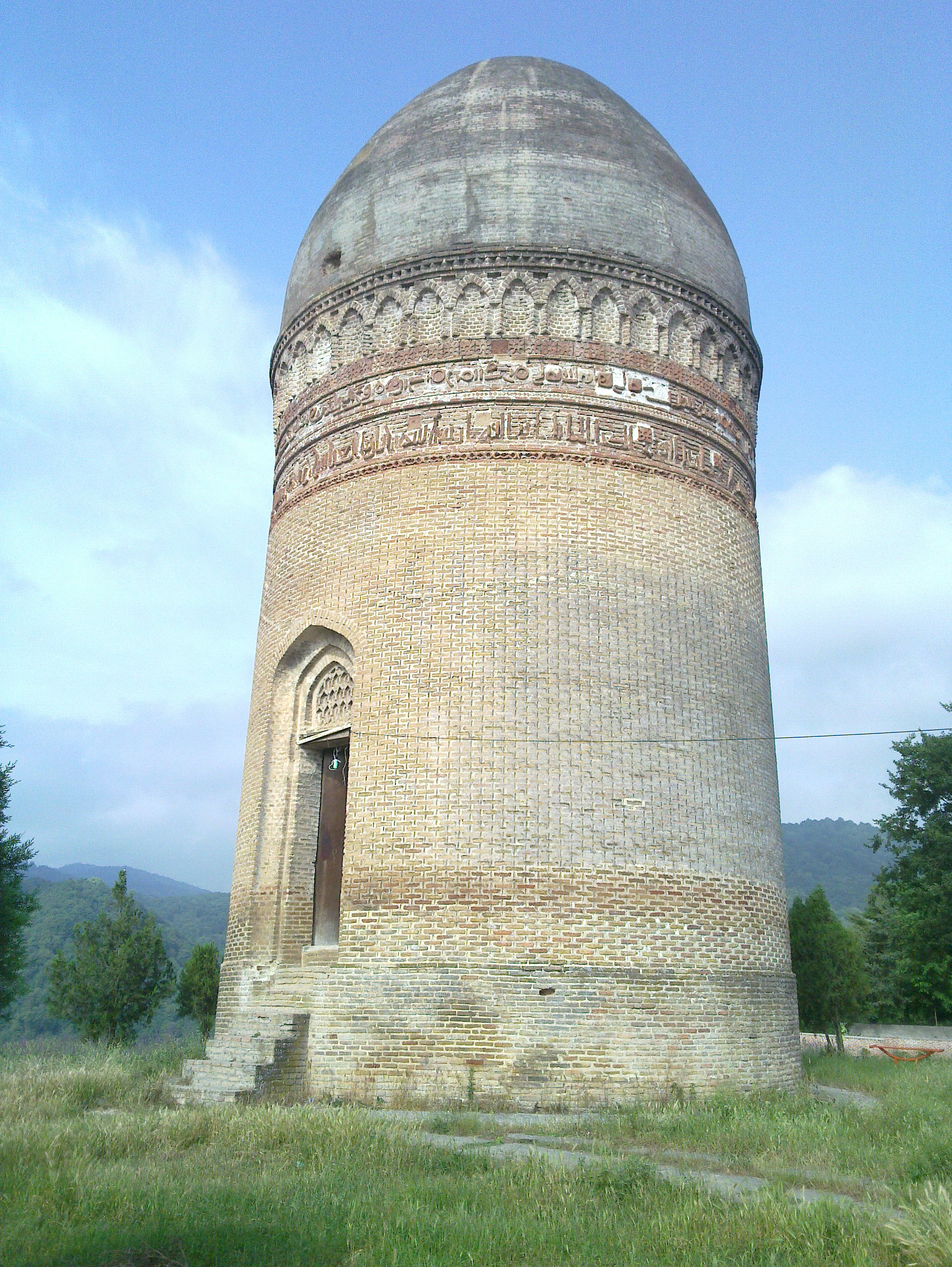
The Lajim Tower in Savadkuh, where Shahriyar ibn Abbas is buried.

Kiya Abu'l-Fawaris Shahriyar ibn Abbas ibn Shahriyar (Persian: کیا ابوالفارس شهریار بن عباس بن شهریار), better simply known as Shahriyar ibn Abbas (شهریار بن عباس) was a Bavandid prince, who is solely known for being mentioned in the inscription on the mausoleum in Savadkuh, known as the Lajim Tower. The mausoleum was constructed in 1022, where he was most already likely dead. The person who ordered the construction was his mother Chihrazad, whilst the name of the architect was a certain al-Husayn ibn Ali. In the inscription, Shahriyar is labeled as "Client of the Commander of the Faithful" (mawlā amīr al-muʾminīn). However, he is not called ispahbad, which was the title used by the Bavandid rulers, and thus it is dubious if he ever ruled.

Shahriyar was possibly a grandson of the Bavandid ruler Shahriyar III (r. 986-988), and may have been the Shahriyar that the prominent Persian poet and author of Shahnameh ("Book of Kings"), Ferdowsi visited in 1010/1.

== Notes ==
a: The Bavandid ruler Abu Ja'far Muhammad, who was a contemporary of Shahriyar, had constructed his mausoleum a year earlier, where he is also labeled as "Client of the Commander of the Faithful", but also as ispahbad.

== Sources ==
- Madelung, W. (1984). "ĀL-E BĀVAND (BAVANDIDS)". Encyclopaedia Iranica, Vol. I, Fasc. 7. London u.a.: Routledge & Kegan Paul. pp. 747–753. ISBN 90-04-08114-3.
- Babaie, Sussan; Grigor, Talinn (2015). Persian Kingship and Architecture: Strategies of Power in Iran from the Achaemenids to the Pahlavis. I.B.Tauris. pp. 1–288. ISBN 9780857734778.
