= Ali II =

Ali II may refer to:

- Ali ibn Umar (ruled 874–883), Sultan of Morocco
- Ali II Lashkari (ruled 1034–1049), Shaddadid emir
- Ali II (Bavandid ruler) (ruled 1271)
- Ali II of Bornu, 17th century ruler of the Bornu Empire
- Ali II ibn Hussein (1712–1782), Bey of Tunis
- Ali II of Yejju (c. 1819–c. 1866), Ethiopian noble
- Dündar Ali Osman Osmanoğlu (1930–2021), titular Sultan of Turkey and Ottoman Caliph from 2017 to his death under the name Ali II
