= Bahram ibn Shahriyar =

- Occupation: Prince of the Bavand dynasty
- Known for: Struggle for the Bavandid throne in the early 12th century

Bahram ibn Shahriyar (Persian: بهرام بن شهریار), was an Iranian prince from the Bavand dynasty.

== Biography ==
Bahram was the son of Shahriyar IV, and had three brothers named Qarin III, Yazdagird, and Ali I.

In 1118, Ali I ascended the Bavandid throne, but was shortly imprisoned by the Seljuq Sultan Muhammad I, who wanted to have direct rule over Mazandaran. Meanwhile, in Mazandaran, Ali's brother Bahram and his nephew, Faramurz were struggling for the Bavandid throne. Muhammad shortly died, and was succeeded by his son Mahmud II who released Ali from prison, gave him his aunt in marriage, and recognized him as the ruler of the Bavand dynasty. Faramurz agreed to recognize the authority of Ali, but Bahram resisted, until he was defeated. Bahram then fled to the court of Mahmud II, and requested his help. Mahmud supported Bahram for sometime, but later stopped doing so. Bahram then unsuccessfully to make the Ismailis murder Ali.

In 1119, Ahmad Sanjar, with the aid of the Kakuyid ruler Garshasp II and several other minor rulers, invaded Jibal and forced Mahmud II to cede him Mazandaran and other parts of western Iran. Bahram then joined Ahmad Sanjar. Ahmad Sanjar then ordered Ali to meet him at his court. Ali, however, disobeyed, and instead sent his son Shah Ghazi Rustam, who was also related to Ahmad Sanjar from his mother's side.

Ahmad Sanjar was angered by Ali's action, and later sent Shah Ghazi Rustam back to Mazandaran. Ahmad Sanjar then recognized Bahram as the ruler of Mazandaran, and gave him an army to conquer the region. Ali immediately lost the support of many of his supporters, but those who remained loyal to him helped him to repelled Bahram. Bahram then withdrew to Nishapur, where he stayed with the amir Öner, until the latter was murdered by the Ismailis in 1121. Bahram then fled to Ghiyath ad-Din Mas'ud, who had recently become the ruler of Gorgan and promised to aid him in his conquest of Mazandaran. However, Ali managed to have Bahram assassinated in 1122.

== Sources ==
- Bosworth, C. E. (1968). "The Political and Dynastic History of the Iranian World (A.D. 1000–1217)". In Frye, R. N. (ed.). The Cambridge History of Iran, Volume 5: The Saljuq and Mongol periods. Cambridge: Cambridge University Press. pp. 1–202. ISBN 0-521-06936-X.
- Madelung, W. (1984). "ĀL-E BĀVAND (BAVANDIDS)". Encyclopaedia Iranica, Vol. I, Fasc. 7. London u.a.: Routledge & Kegan Paul. pp. 747–753. ISBN 90-04-08114-3.
