= Ali I =

Ali I may refer to:

- Ali ibn Muhammad ibn Idris (died 848), Idrisid sultan of the Western Maghreb
- Ali I (Bavandid ruler), ruler of the Bavand dynasty from 1118 to 1142
- Baba Ali Chaouch (died 1718), Dey-Pacha, or sultan of Algiers
- Ali bin Hussein, King of Hejaz (1879–1935), king of Hejaz from 1924 to 1925
- Şehzade Ali Vasib (1903–1983), titular Sultan of Turkey and Ottoman Caliph from 1977 to 1983 under the name Ali I
