= Ardashir I (Bavandid ruler) =

Ardashir I اردشیر

Ispahbadh of the Bavand dynasty
- Reign: 1173 – 1205
- Predecessor: Hasan I
- Successor: Rustam V
- Spouse: Daughter of Tekish
- Issue: Sharaf al-Muluk; Sharaf al-Dawla; Rukn al-Dawla Qarin; Rustam V
- Husam al-Dawla Ardashir ibn Hasan
- Father: Hasan I
- Religion: Twelver Shia Islam

Ardashir I (Persian: اردشیر), was the ruler of the Bavand dynasty from 1173 to 1205. He was the son and successor of Hasan I.

== Biography ==
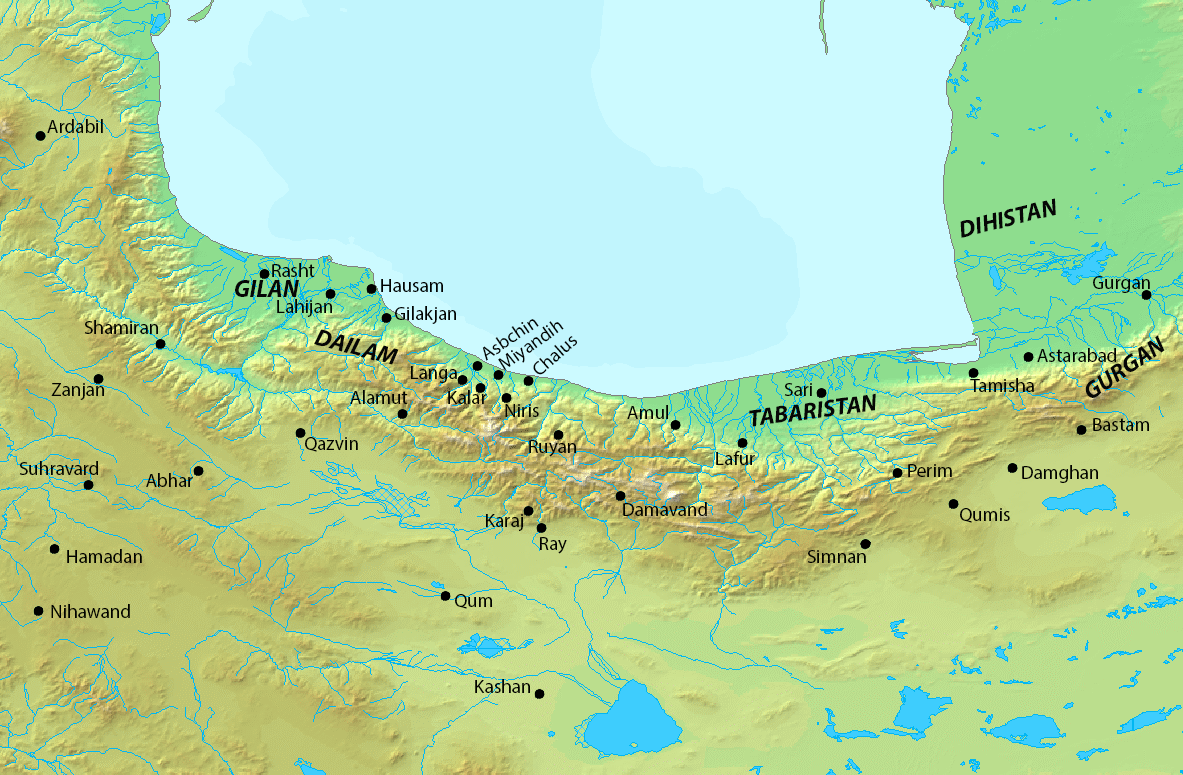
Map of northern Iran

=== Alliance with the Khwarazmians ===
In 1173, after the death of his father, Ardashir I ascended the Bavandid throne. Right after the accession of Ardashir, his kingdom was invaded by the Khwarazmian prince Sultan Shah and the ruler of Khorasan, Mu'ayyid al-Din Ai-Aba, who captured several fortresses and cities from Ardashir. One year later, however, Mu'ayyid al-Din Ai-Aba was killed by Sultan Shah's brother Tekish. Ardashir quickly used the opportunity to reconquer Damghan and Bastam. Ardashir shortly made an alliance with Tekish, and made an agreement that when Tekish's daughter became old enough, she should marry Ardashir. In 1183, Tekish's daughter was sent along with her mother to the Bavandid capital of Sari, at which time the Oghuz leader Malik Dinar plundered the eastern parts of Mazandaran. Tekish shortly arrived at Gorgan, and forced the Oghuz leader to leave Tabaristan. He then demanded that Ardashir cede Gorgan to him, to which Ardashir was forced to agree. Ardashir also shortly married Tekish's daughter.

=== War with the Paduspanids ===
Ardashir now focused on his Paduspanid vassals, who were getting too powerful; he took much of Kai Ka'us I's territory which had been given to the latter during the reign of Ardashir's grandfather Shah Ghazi Rustam IV. Ardashir also ordered his general Mubariz al-Din Arjasf to attack Kai Ka'us. Sometime later, however, Kai Ka'us' son Justan died, and only his 1 year old grandson Zarrinkamar survived, whom Ardashir I agreed to raise and make ruler of the Paduspanid dynasty when the latter had grown up. Kai Ka'us shortly died in 1184. After his death, the nobles of the Paduspanid capital of Ruyan made his nephew Hazarasp II the new ruler of the dynasty. Unlike his predecessor, Hazarasp was a tyrant; he lost allegiance from several of his vassals by having some of their relatives killed, and making peace with the Ismailis, who were the most hated enemy of the Bavandids and several local rulers.

Ardashir, after having received the news of Hazarasp's actions, ordered Arjasf to invade Ruyan. Hazarasp managed to flee from Ruyan, and seek shelter with the Ismailis, who agreed to help him; Hazarasp shortly invaded Ruyan and killed its governor. Ardashir, greatly enraged by these actions, re-captured Ruyan and made Hezabr al-Din Khvorshid the new governor of the city. Hazarasp, after several failures to re-conquer Ruyan, asked Ardashir for forgiveness. He was, however, instead imprisoned by Ardashir, and was secretly murdered by Hezabr al-Din in case that Ardashir would restore Ruyan to Hazarasp.

=== War with the Khwarazmians ===
Tekish, during his campaigns gained absolute and non-disputed control over Khorasan, and thus some local rulers and emirs declared independence from Ardashir, as they preferred the lordship of the powerful ruler Tekish. This degraded relations between Ardashir and his Tekish. Ardashir shortly captured and killed one of his disloyal vassals, which made Tekish in revenge invade Mazandaran and devastate the eastern parts of the region. Ardashir shortly began to adopt an anti-Khwarazmian policy, and began improving his relations with the Seljuq Sultan Toghrul III, the military ruler Pahlavan ibn Ildeniz and the Abbasid Caliph al-Nasir. In 1191, Tekish occupied the eastern territories of Ardashir and demanded Ardashir to cede Bastam and Damghan, which he did have no choice to but to cede.

One year later, Ardashir sent an army to aid Toghrul III in capturing Ray. He shortly made an alliance with the latter and made an alliance with his former enemy Sultan Shah, who was in Merv and threatening the stability of Tekish's kingdom. Ardashir shortly recaptured Gorgan, while Sultan Shah captured the important city of Nishapur. Ardashir's hope to destroy Tekish's kingdom, however, came to an end when Sultan Shah was killed in 1193. Things began to look more grim for Ardashir when Tekish killed Toghrul at Ray the following year. Ardashir shortly tried to regain his good relations with Tekish by sending an army under his youngest son Rukn al-Dawla Qarin to aid Tekish in his campaigns. The army, was, however, removed from Tekish's service, who sent an army under his amir Sutash to punish Ardashir for having made an alliance with his enemies. Sutash shortly devastated parts of Ardashir's domains, including the important city of Sari, which was now under the control of a Khwarazmian governor.

In 1199, Tekish made another invasion of Ardashir's territories, and took control over Firuzkuh, Ustunavand, and Folul. He shortly ordered Ardashir to send his son Sharaf al-Muluk to work under Tekish. During the same period, a group of nobles, under Ardashir's second son, Rustam V, plotted to overthrow Ardashir, and to crown Rustam V as the ruler of the Bavand dynasty. The amir Sutash took the advantage of the plot to settle permanently in Sari in order to increase his influence over Mazandaran, while another amir named Argush, occupied Amol.

Ardashir then defeated the conspiracy and imprisoned Rustam V. He shortly defeated Argush and regained control of Amol. Shortly after Tekish dismissed Sharaf al-Muluk and sent him back to Ardashir. He demanded that Ardashir send his daughter back. Ardashir, however, disobeyed this order. Shortly Tekish died, before he could punish Ardashir. He was succeeded by his son, Muhammad II.

=== Death ===
After Tekish's death, the power of the Khwarazmian dynasty in western Iran collapsed and all his former vassals rebelled. Muhammad II, was not able to reconquer lost Khwarazmian territory since he was busy in the east, which gave Ardashir the opportunity to reconquer Damghan, Firuzkuh, Folul and Ustunawand. When the Ghurid Sultan Mu'izz al-Din Muhammad invaded Khwarezm in 1204, he sent a delegate to Ardashir, who agreed to recognize his authority. However, Mu'izz al-Din Muhammad was himself shortly defeated and expelled from Khwarezm in 1205. Ardashir shortly died himself. About the same time, his heir Sharaf al-Muluk died, and the succession passed to another son, Rustam V, who was freed from prison and was brought to the throne at Amol.

== Sources ==
- Bosworth, C. E. (1968). "The Political and Dynastic History of the Iranian World (A.D. 1000–1217)". In Frye, R. N. (ed.). The Cambridge History of Iran, Volume 5: The Saljuq and Mongol periods. Cambridge: Cambridge University Press. pp. 1–202. ISBN 0-521-06936-X.
- Madelung, W. (1984). "ĀL-E BĀVAND (BAVANDIDS)". Encyclopaedia Iranica, Vol. I, Fasc. 7. London u.a.: Routledge & Kegan Paul. pp. 747–753. ISBN 90-04-08114-3.
- Madelung, W. (2010). "BADUSPANIDS". Encyclopaedia Iranica, Online Edition.

Preceded by Hasan I	Bavand ruler 1173–1205	Succeeded by Rustam V
