= Yazdagird (Bavandid ruler) =

Yazdagird (Persian: یزدگرد) was the ruler of the Bavand dynasty from 1271 to 1298. He was the cousin and successor of Ali of Tabaristan.

== Biography ==
Yazdagird was the son of Shahriyar, who was the brother of the Bavand king Ardashir II of Tabaristan. During the reign of Yazdagird, his overlord, the Ilkhanate, were in a civil war. During this period, Yazdagird's kingdom experienced a period of relative prosperity and security. He is also known for building several madrassas in his capital, Amol. Yazdagird died in 1298, and was succeeded by his son Shahriyar V.

== Sources ==
- Madelung, W. (1984). "ĀL-E BĀVAND (BAVANDIDS)". Encyclopaedia Iranica, Vol. I, Fasc. 7. London u.a.: Routledge & Kegan Paul. pp. 747–753. ISBN 90-04-08114-3.

Preceded by Ali II	Bavand ruler 1271–1300	Succeeded by Shahriyar V
