= Sharwin III =

Ruler of the Bavand dynasty in 986

- Ispahbadh of Tabaristan / Bavand ruler

Bavand ruler
- Reign: 986
- Predecessor: al-Marzuban (first reign)
- Successor: Shahriyar III
- Born: Tabaristan (presumably)
- House: Bavand dynasty (Kayusiyya branch)
- Father: Rustam II

Sharwin III (Persian: شروین), was the fourteenth ruler of the Bavand dynasty briefly in 986. He was the brother and successor of al-Marzuban.

Sharwin was the son of Rustam II. In 986, after the death of Rustam II, Sharwin's brother al-Marzuban ascended the Bavandid throne. There have been several confusions about the reign of the Bavandid kings after the death of Rustam II. In 986, al-Marzuban is no longer mentioned as the ruler of the Bavand dynasty, and Sharwin III is instead mentioned as the ruler of the dynasty. A certain Shahriyar III is later mentioned as the ruler of the Bavand dynasty in the following year. Nothing more is known about Sharwin III.

== Sources ==
- Madelung, W. (1975). "The Minor Dynasties of Northern Iran". In Frye, R.N. (ed.). The Cambridge History of Iran, Volume 4: From the Arab Invasion to the Saljuqs. Cambridge: Cambridge University Press. pp. 198–249. ISBN 978-0-521-20093-6.
- Madelung, W. (1984). "ĀL-E BĀVAND (BAVANDIDS)". Encyclopaedia Iranica, Vol. I, Fasc. 7. London u.a.: Routledge & Kegan Paul. pp. 747–753. ISBN 90-04-08114-3.

Regnal titles
| Preceded by al-Marzuban | Bavand ruler 986 | Succeeded by Shahriyar III |
