= Qarin II =

Bavanid ruler from 1057 to 1074

- Ispahbadh of Tabaristan / Bavand ruler

Bavand ruler
- Reign: 1057–1074
- Predecessor: Abu Ja'far Muhammad
- Successor: Shahriyar IV
- Born: Tabaristan (presumed)
- Died: 1074
- House: Bavand dynasty
- Father: Surkhab (possibly son of Shahriyar III)

Qarin II (Persian: کارین), was the ruler of the Bavand dynasty from 1057 to 1074. He was the son of a certain Surkhab, who was possibly the son of the Bavandid ruler Shahriyar III. Not much more is known about Qarin II; he died in 1074, and was succeeded by his son Shahriyar IV.

== Sources ==
- Madelung, W. (1984). "ĀL-E BĀVAND (BAVANDIDS)". Encyclopaedia Iranica, Vol. I, Fasc. 7. London u.a.: Routledge & Kegan Paul. pp. 747–753. ISBN 90-04-08114-3.

Regnal titles
Preceded by Abu Ja'far Muhammad	Bavandid ruler 1057–1074	Succeeded by Shahriyar IV
