= Shahriyar II =

- Ispahbadh of Tabaristan / Bavand ruler

Bavand ruler
- Reign: 930–964
- Predecessor: Sharwin II
- Successor: Rustam II
- Born: Tabaristan (presumably)
- Died: 964
- House: Bavand dynasty (Kayusiyya branch)
- Father: Sharwin II
- Religion: Islam (associated with Ziyarids, Buyids, Samanids influence)

Shahriyar II (Persian: شهریار) was the eleventh ruler of the Bavand dynasty from 930 to 964. He was the son and successor of Sharwin II.

After the fall of the Zaydids of Tabaristan, Shahriyar II became involved in a power struggle between the Buyids and Ziyarids for the Tabaristan region. The Ziyarid ruler of Tabaristan, Vushmgir, is known to have married the sister of Shahriyar. In 943, Vushmgir was expelled from Ray by the Buyid by Rukn al-Dawla, and took refugee in the court of Shahriyar II. In 948, Rukn al-Dawla conquered Tabaristan, and forced Shahriyar to swear allegiance to the Buyids in person. However, Shahriyar still remained loyal to the Ziyarids and their Samanid overlords. Because of his pro-Ziyarid policies, Shahriyar was deposed in favor of his pro-Buyid brother Rustam II in 964. Shahriyar later tried to reclaim the Bavand throne by invading Tabaristan with a Samanid army in 968, but to no avail.

== Sources ==
- Madelung, W. (1975). "The Minor Dynasties of Northern Iran". In Frye, R.N. (ed.). The Cambridge History of Iran, Volume 4: From the Arab Invasion to the Saljuqs. Cambridge: Cambridge University Press. pp. 198–249. ISBN 978-0-521-20093-6.
- Frye, R.N. (1975). "The Saljuq and Mongol periods". In Frye, R.N. (ed.). The Cambridge History of Iran, Volume 5: The Iranian world. Cambridge: Cambridge University Press. pp. 1–659. ISBN 0-521-20093-8.

Preceded by Sharwin II	Bavand ruler 930–964	Succeeded by Rustam II
