= Shahriyar V =

Shahriyar V (Persian: شهریار) was the ruler of the Bavand dynasty from 1300 to 1310. He was the son and successor of Yazdagird of Tabaristan.

After Shahriyar's accession of the Bavand throne in 1300, the Ilkhanid amir Mo'men marched towards Amol and greatly weakened the strength of Shahriyar's kingdom. Shahriyar died in 1310, leaving his kingdom in a weakened condition, which quickly fell into a war of succession between his brothers, Shah-Kaykhusraw, and Shams al-Muluk Muhammad. Shah-Kaykhusraw, with Ilkhanid support, managed to emerge victorious during the civil war, and become the new king of the Bavand dynasty.

== Sources ==
- Madelung, W. (1975). "The Minor Dynasties of Northern Iran". In Frye, R.N. (ed.). The Cambridge History of Iran, Volume 4: From the Arab Invasion to the Saljuqs. Cambridge: Cambridge University Press. pp. 198–249. ISBN 978-0-521-20093-6.
- Frye, R.N. (1975). "The Saljuq and Mongol periods". In Frye, R.N. (ed.). The Cambridge History of Iran, Volume 5: The Iranian world. Cambridge: Cambridge University Press. pp. 1–659. ISBN 0-521-20093-8.

Preceded by Yazdagird of Tabaristan	Bavand ruler 1300–1310	Succeeded by Shah-Kaykhusraw
