= Al-Marzuban =

- Ispahbadh / Bavand ruler

Bavand ruler
- Reign: 979–986; 987–998; 998–1006
- Predecessor: Rustam II
- Successor: Sharwin III
- Died: 1006
- House: Bavand dynasty (Kayusiyya branch)
- Father: Rustam II

Al-Marzuban or Marzuban bin Rustam of Parim (Persian: مرزبان بن رستم پریمی), was the thirteenth ruler of the Bavand dynasty from 979 to 986. He was the son and successor of Rustam II. In some sources, his name was changed to Rustam ibn al-Marzuban, which caused confusion among the historians, and made them think that they were two people.

== Biography ==
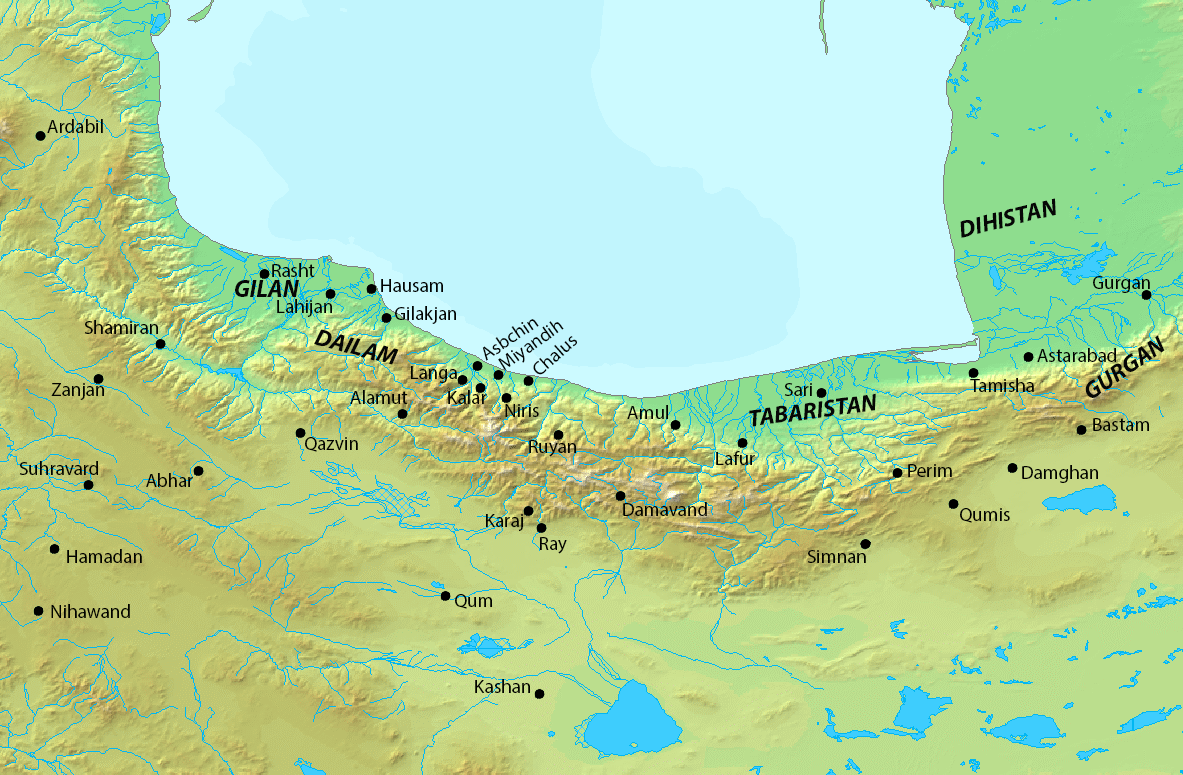
Map of northern Iran

According to the historian Hilal al-Sabi', al-Marzuban had a sister named Sayyida Shirin, who was the wife of the Buyid ruler Fakhr al-Dawla, and mother of Majd al-Dawla. However, according to the Qabus-nama made by the Ziyarid ruler Keikavus (who was of Bavandid descent), Sayyida Shirin was the niece of al-Marzuban. There have been several confusions about the reign of the Bavandid kings after the death of Rustam II. In 986, al-Marzuban is not longer mentioned as the ruler of the Bavand dynasty, and a certain Sharwin III is instead mentioned.

A certain Shahriyar III is later mentioned as the ruler of the Bavand dynasty in the following year. al-Marzuban is then once again mentioned in sources, as the having deposed Shahriyar III, and restored himself as the ruler of the Bavand dynasty. In 998, Shahriyar III returned to Tabaristan with Ziyarid aid, and wrested the Bavandid capital of Perim from al-Marzuban. However, al-Marzuban, with Buyid aid, managed to quickly repel him from the city. Shahriyar III shortly made another counter-attack, and defeated al-Marzuban. Shahriyar III then ascended the Bavandid throne, and declared independence from Ziyarid rule. al-Marzuban used this opportunity to become the vassal of the Ziyarids, and regain his throne. Shahriyar III then fled to Ray, where he died in 1000. In 999, the famous Iranian scholar Al-Biruni, visited the court of al-Marzuban.

Al-Marzuban probably reigned until 1006, when the Bavand dynasty was put to an end by the Ziyarid ruler Qabus. Nevertheless, several Bavandid princes continued to rule in small local parts of Mazandaran. A certain Bavandid prince named Abu Ja'far Muhammad, is mentioned in aiding Majd al-Dawla against the Dailamite rebel Ibn Fuladh in 1016, and against the Kakuyid ruler Muhammad ibn Rustam Dushmanziyar in 1028, who may himself have been of Bavandid descent.

== Works ==
Al-Marzuban is known to have written in Tabari the Marzuban-nama, which tells about the history of the pre-Islamic kings of Iran.

== Sources ==
- Madelung, W. (1975). "The Minor Dynasties of Northern Iran". In Frye, Richard N. (ed.). The Cambridge History of Iran: From the Arab Invasion to the Saljuqs. Vol. 4. Cambridge: Cambridge University Press. pp. 198—249. ISBN 0-521-20093-8.
- Madelung, W. (1984). "Āl-e Bāvand (Bavandids)". In Yarshater, Ehsan (ed.). Encyclopædia Iranica. Vol. I/7: Ahriman–Alafrank. London and New York: Routledge & Kegan Paul. pp. 747–753. ISBN 978-0-71009-096-6.
- Frye, R. N. (1960). "Bāwand". In Gibb, H. A. R.; Kramers, J. H.; Lévi-Provençal, E.; Schacht, J.; Lewis, B. & Pellat, Ch. (eds.). The Encyclopaedia of Islam, Second Edition. Volume I: A–B. Leiden: E. J. Brill. p. 1110. OCLC 495469456.

Regnal titles
| Preceded by Rustam II | Bavand ruler 979–986 | Succeeded by Sharwin III |
| Preceded by Shahriyar III | Bavand ruler 987–998 | Succeeded by Shahriyar III |
| Preceded by Shahriyar III | Bavand ruler 998–1006 | Succeeded by Abu Ja'far Muhammad |
