= Sharaf al-Muluk =

Bavand ruler (1328–1334)

Sharaf al-Muluk (Persian: شرف الملوک) was the ruler of the Bavand dynasty from 1328 to 1334. He was the son and successor of Shah-Kaykhusraw. Little is known about Sharaf; he died in 1334, and was succeeded by his brother Hasan II of Tabaristan.

== Sources ==
- Madelung, W. (1975). "The Minor Dynasties of Northern Iran". In Frye, R.N. (ed.). The Cambridge History of Iran, Volume 4: From the Arab Invasion to the Saljuqs. Cambridge: Cambridge University Press. pp. 198–249. ISBN 978-0-521-20093-6.
- Frye, R.N. (1975). "The Saljuq and Mongol periods". In Frye, R.N. (ed.). The Cambridge History of Iran, Volume 5: The Iranian world. Cambridge: Cambridge University Press. pp. 1–659. ISBN 0-521-20093-8.

| Preceded by Shah-Kaykhusraw | Bavand ruler ca. 1328–1334 | Succeeded by Hasan II of Tabaristan |
