= Rustam V =

Ruler of the Bavand dynasty during 1205–1210

Rustam V (Persian: رستم), was the ruler of the Bavand dynasty from 1205 to 1210. He was the son and successor of Ardashir I.

== Biography ==
Rustam V was the second son of Ardashir I, and had three brothers named Sharaf al-Muluk, Sharaf al-Dawla, and Rukn al-Dawla Qarin. Although Sharaf al-Muluk was the eldest of the brothers, Sharaf al-Muluk was chosen as the heir of the Bavand dynasty. Rustam V is first mentioned as the leader of a group of nobles which plotted to overthrow Ardashir and crown him as the ruler of the Bavand dynasty. Ardashir, however, discovered about the plot, and had Rustam V imprisoned. In 1205, Ardashir died—about the same time, Sharaf al-Muluk died, and thus the succession passed to Rustam V, who was freed from prison and brought to the throne at the Bavandid capital of Amol.

However, his brother Rukn ad-Dawla Qarin, claimed the throne for himself and went to Khwarazm, where he requested aid from the Khwarazmian king Muhammad II. Muhammad II agreed to help him, and ordered his brother, Ali-Shah, who was the ruler of Damghan and Bastam, to invade Rustam's domains, which he did. The brothers, however, made a peace treaty, which resulted in Rukn ad-Dawla Qarin receiving the inheritance of Sharaf al-Muluk. Meanwhile, the relations between Ali-Shah and Muhammad II became hostile, and, in the end, Ali-Shah was killed by Muhammad II. During the rest of Rustam's reign, Mazandaran fell under heavy influence from the Khwarezmians, while the Nizari Ismaili's began conquering parts of Rustam's territory, and even assassinated Rukn ad-Dawla Qarin. On 1 April 1210, Rustam V was betrayed and murdered by his former subject the Alid Abu Ridha Husayn. With no Bavandid heir left, the Bavand kingdom was incorporated into the Khwarazmian Empire. However, Rustam's sister, bore a son named Shahriyar, who would later have a son named Kinkhwar, who in turn begot a son named Ardashir II, who restored the Bavand dynasty.

== Sources ==
- Bosworth, C. E. (1968). "The Political and Dynastic History of the Iranian World (A.D. 1000–1217)". In Frye, R. N. (ed.). The Cambridge History of Iran, Volume 5: The Saljuq and Mongol periods. Cambridge: Cambridge University Press. pp. 1–202. ISBN 0-521-06936-X.
- Madelung, W. (1984). "ĀL-E BĀVAND (BAVANDIDS)". Encyclopaedia Iranica, Vol. I, Fasc. 7. London u.a.: Routledge & Kegan Paul. pp. 747–753. ISBN 90-04-08114-3.

Preceded by Ardashir I	Bavand ruler 1205–1210	Succeeded by Khwarazmian conquest
