= Ali II Zainami =

Mai of the Kanem–Bornu Empire
- Reign: 16th century (1–5 years) c. 1544–1545 (Note: Most king lists (girgams) and chronicles translated in the 19th–20th centuries give Ali a reign of just one year (Barth, Palmer, Nachtigal). Landeroin gives Ali a reign of 5 years and 5 months. Urvoy gives 4 years. As a result of this, and due to different calculations for other mais, various dates have been given for his reign, including 1545 (Barth), 1545–1546 (Palmer), 1544–1548 (Urvoy), 1538–1543 (Landeroin), and 1562–1563 (Nachtigal). Cohen (1966) considered a reign of a year most likely. Later authors have broadly followed Barth and Palmer with regnal dates; 1545–1546 (Stewart, 1989), 1544–1546 (Bosworth, 2012).)
- Predecessor: Muhammad VI Aminami
- Successor: Dunama VI Muhammad
- Died: c. 1545; Zamtam, Bornu
- Spouse: Amsa Aliram
- Issue: Aissa Koli (?); Idris IV Alooma
- Dynasty: Sayfawa dynasty
- Father: Idris III Katagarmabe
- Mother: Zainab

Ali II (ʿAlī bin Idrīs), called Ali Zainami, was briefly mai (ruler) of the Kanem–Bornu Empire in the mid-16th century, ruling approximately 1544–1545.

== Life ==
Ali was a son of mai Idris III Katagarmabe. His mother was named Zainab. Ali became mai in the mid-16th century, succeeding his brother Muhammad VI Aminami. Ali was remembered as a just ruler, who kept the Bilala, vassal rulers of Kanem, in strict subjection to the empire.

Ali had a short reign, described by the German explorer Heinrich Barth (who visited Bornu in the mid-19th century) as "too short to be of any real importance". He may have ruled for just a year, or perhaps for about five years. Ali died at a site in Bornu called Zamtam and was succeeded as mai by Dunama VI Muhammad, probably his nephew. Ali is known to have had a consort named Amsa Aliram, who was the mother of Ali's son Idris IV Alooma.
