= Shah Ghazi Rustam =

Shah Ghazi Rustam شاه غازی رستم
- Ispahbad
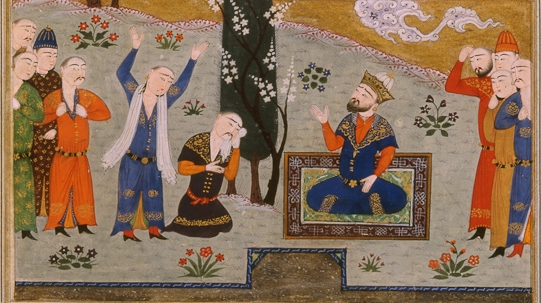
- Shah Ghazi Rustam and his court

King of Mazandaran
- Reign: 1142–1165
- Predecessor: Ali I
- Successor: Hasan I

King of Gilan
- Reign: 1156–1165
- Predecessor: New office
- Successor: Hasan I
- Born: ca. 1105
- Died: 23 January 1165 (aged 60); Sari, Mazandaran
- Issue: Girdbazu; Hasan I Unnamed daughter
- Dynasty: Bavand dynasty
- Father: Ali I
- Religion: Twelver Shia Islam

Shah Ghazi Rustam (Persian: شاه غازی رستم), was king of the Bavand dynasty of Mazandaran, ruling from 1142 to 1165. He expanded the borders of the kingdom at the expense of his neighbors, particularly the Ismailis and the Seljuks. He established a Bavandid presence in Gilan as a result of his frequent vengeful raids against the Ismailis, who had assassinated his son and heir, Girdbazu. He also brought Qumis and Ray under Bavandid control during his wars against the Seljuks and the Karakhanids.

Shah Ghazi's reign represented the pinnacle of Bavandid power and influence in Iran, and Shah Ghazi himself was considered the most illustrious king of the dynasty.

== Name ==
The name of Shah Ghazi Rustam is combination of Persian and Arabic—"shah" meaning king in Persian, and "ghazi" meaning warrior in Arabic. "Rustam" was the name of the popular mythological Iranian warrior Rostam. Shah Ghazi Rustam's laqab was Nusrat al-Din ("victory of the religion").

== Birth and background ==
Shah Ghazi was born in ca. 1105, as the son of Ali I, whose father, Shahriyar IV (r. 1074–1114), was the then Bavandid king of Mazandaran. The Bavand kingdom was during this period a vassal of the Seljuk Empire, which had a decade earlier under sultan Malik-Shah I (r. 1072–1092) controlled a vast area stretching from the Hindu Kush to eastern Anatolia and from Central Asia to the Persian Gulf. However, after the assassination of Malik-Shah and his vizier Nizam al-Mulk in 1092, the Seljuk Empire had fallen into decline. Shahriyar IV had thus been able to disobey the orders of the Seljuk sultan Muhammad I Tapar (r. 1105–1118) several times. After Shahriyar IV's death in 1114, his son Qarin III succeeded him, and started arresting and imprisoning many loyal servants of his father, thus heavily weakening the kingdom. He later fell ill, and died in 1117 after he asked the local people to pledge allegiance to his son Rustam III, who succeeded him. Rustam III's reign, however, was even more short-lived—he was poisoned by his stepmother, the sister of Muhammad I Tapar, who wanted to marry Ali I, who ascended the Bavandid throne.

== Early life ==
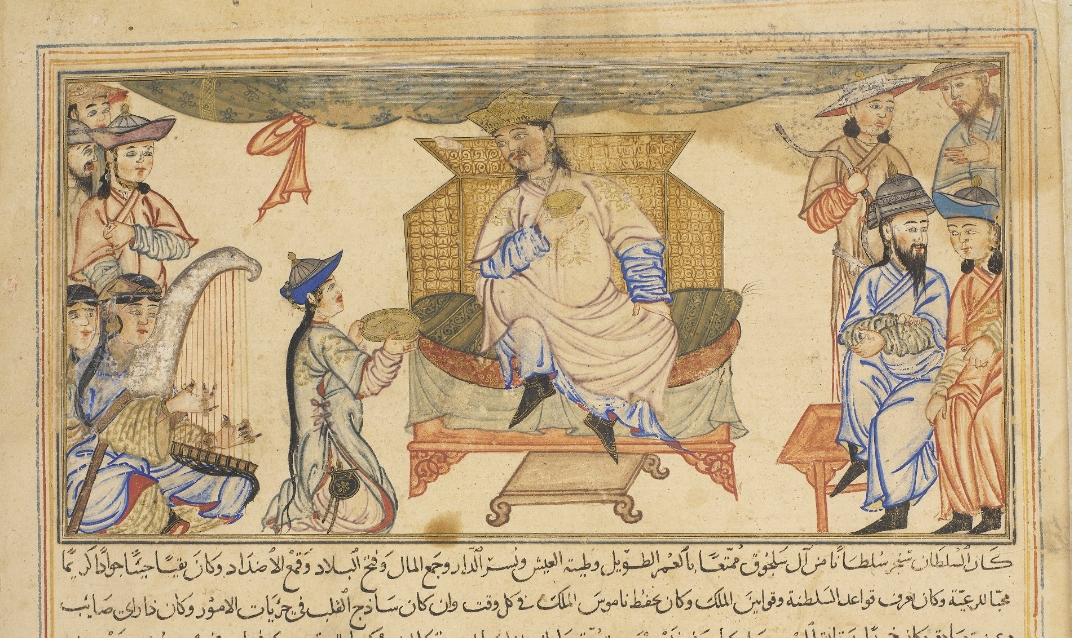
14th-century illustration of Ahmad Sanjar and his court.

Shah Ghazi is first mentioned in 1119, when the Seljuk sultan Ahmad Sanjar (r. 1118–1157) ordered Ali to meet him at his court, who disobeyed, and instead sent Shah Ghazi. Sanjar, however, was extremely unsatisfied with Shah Ghazi and dismissed him after four months. In 1131, Sanjar ordered Ali to join him in an expedition to Iraq. Shah Ghazi was once again sent to Sanjar, where he distinguished himself and was wounded at the battle of Dinavar in 25 May 1132, where Sanjar emerged victorious. Sanjar then granted Shah Ghazi several honors and allowed him to return to his father in Mazandaran.

In 1141/1142, the Khwarazm-Shah Atsiz (r. 1127–1156) invaded Khorasan and seized Gorgan from Ali. He then imprisoned the local Bavandid governor Rustam Kabudjama. Shah Ghazi, without the agreement of his father, then met Atsiz, and persuaded him to release Rustam Kabudjama. Ali, after hearing about his son meeting with Atsiz without his approval, criticized his actions. Some time later, Ali, who was too old to rule, abdicated in favor of Shah Ghazi. Ali died three years later at Tammisha and was buried in Sari.

== Reign ==
Shah Ghazi's coronation was most likely done in traditional Bavandid fashion. In accordance with the ancient Iranian style, the coronation lasted seven days, and included the typical banquets, exhilarations, giving of gifts, whilst the renowned statesmen, local rulers, and members of the royal house gathered from all the landscapes. On the eighth day, after the felicitations were complete, Shah Ghazi ascended the throne, fastened the royal waistband, and confirmed the governors in their offices. His antagonistic brother Taj al-Muluk Mardavij had been serving Sanjar at Marv, and as a result had become greatly appreciated by him, even receiving his sister (or daughter) in marriage. After Ali's death, Sanjar gave Mardavij an army to help him become the ruler of the Bavandid kingdom. Mardavij proceeded to capture Gorgan, Tammisha and the fort of Johayna, and not long after besieged Qal'a-ye Dara, where Shah Ghazi had fortified himself. The siege eventually proved to be unsuccessful.

Shah Ghazi died on 23 January 1165 after having been indisposed for some time due to suffering from gout. He was buried in the same site as his father by the prominent figures of Mazandaran, including the ispahbad Majd al-Din Dara, Sabiq al-Dawla Qazvini, Sayyid Hasim Alawi, and Amir Surkhab.

== Sources ==
- Ibn Isfandiyar, Muhammad ibn al-Hasan (1905). An Abridged Translation of the History of Tabaristan, Compiled About A.H. 613 (A.D. 1216). Trans. Edward G. Browne. Leyden: E.J. Brill.
- Madelung, W. (1975). "The Minor Dynasties of Northern Iran". In Frye, R.N. (ed.). The Cambridge History of Iran, Volume 4: From the Arab Invasion to the Saljuqs. Cambridge: Cambridge University Press. pp. 198–249. ISBN 978-0-521-20093-6.
- Bosworth, C. E. (1968). "The Political and Dynastic History of the Iranian World (A.D. 1000–1217)". In Frye, R. N. (ed.). The Cambridge History of Iran, Volume 5: The Saljuq and Mongol periods. Cambridge: Cambridge University Press. pp. 1–202. ISBN 0-521-06936-X.
- Madelung, W. (1984). "ĀL-E BĀVAND (BAVANDIDS)". Encyclopaedia Iranica, Vol. I, Fasc. 7. London u.a.: Routledge & Kegan Paul. pp. 747–753. ISBN 90-04-08114-3.
- Babaie, Sussan; Grigor, Talinn (2015). Persian Kingship and Architecture: Strategies of Power in Iran from the Achaemenids to the Pahlavis. I.B.Tauris. pp. 1–288. ISBN 9780857734778.

Regnal titles
Preceded by Ali I	Bavandid ruler 1142–1165	Succeeded by Hasan I
