= Shah-Kaykhusraw =

- King of Mazandaran
- Reign: 1310–1328
- Predecessor: Shahriyar V
- Successor: Sharaf al-Muluk
- Died: 1328
- Issue: Sharaf al-Muluk; Hasan II
- Dynasty: Bavand dynasty
- Father: Shahriyar V

Shah-Kaykhusraw (Persian: شاه کیخسرو) was the ruler of the Bavand dynasty from 1310 to 1328. He was the brother and successor of Shahriyar V.

== Reign ==
Shahriyar V died in 1310, leaving his kingdom to a weakened condition, which quickly fell into war of succession between Shah-Kaykhusraw, and his brother Shams al-Muluk Muhammad. Shah-Kaykhusraw, with the support of the Ilkhanid Kutlushah, invaded Mazandaran and forced Shams al-Muluk to flee. However, he later returned to Mazandaran, but was killed by Shah-Kaykhusraw, who then crowned himself as the ispahbadh of the Bavand kingdom.

Shah-Kaykhusraw later became involved in a conflict with Kutlushah, and was forced to leave Amol with his family and to take refuge in the domains of his brother-in-law, the Baduspanid king, Nasir al-Din Shahriyar, who later tried to help Shah-Kaykhusraw defeat Kutlushah, and seems to have had some successes in his effort, but was defeated. Shah-Kaykhusraw remained a refugee until Talish Chubani became the governor of Khorasan, in 1317, when Shah-Kaykhusraw restored Bavand authority in Mazandaran. Shah-Kaykhusraw died in 1328, and was succeeded by his son, Sharaf al-Muluk.

== Sources ==
- Madelung, W. (1984). "ĀL-E BĀVAND (BAVANDIDS)". Encyclopaedia Iranica, Vol. I, Fasc. 7. London u.a.: Routledge & Kegan Paul. pp. 747–753. ISBN 90-04-08114-3.

Regnal titles
Preceded by Shahriyar V	Bavandid ruler 1310–1328	Succeeded by Sharaf al-Muluk
