= Abu Ja'far Muhammad =

Abu Ja'far Muhammad ابو جعفر محمد
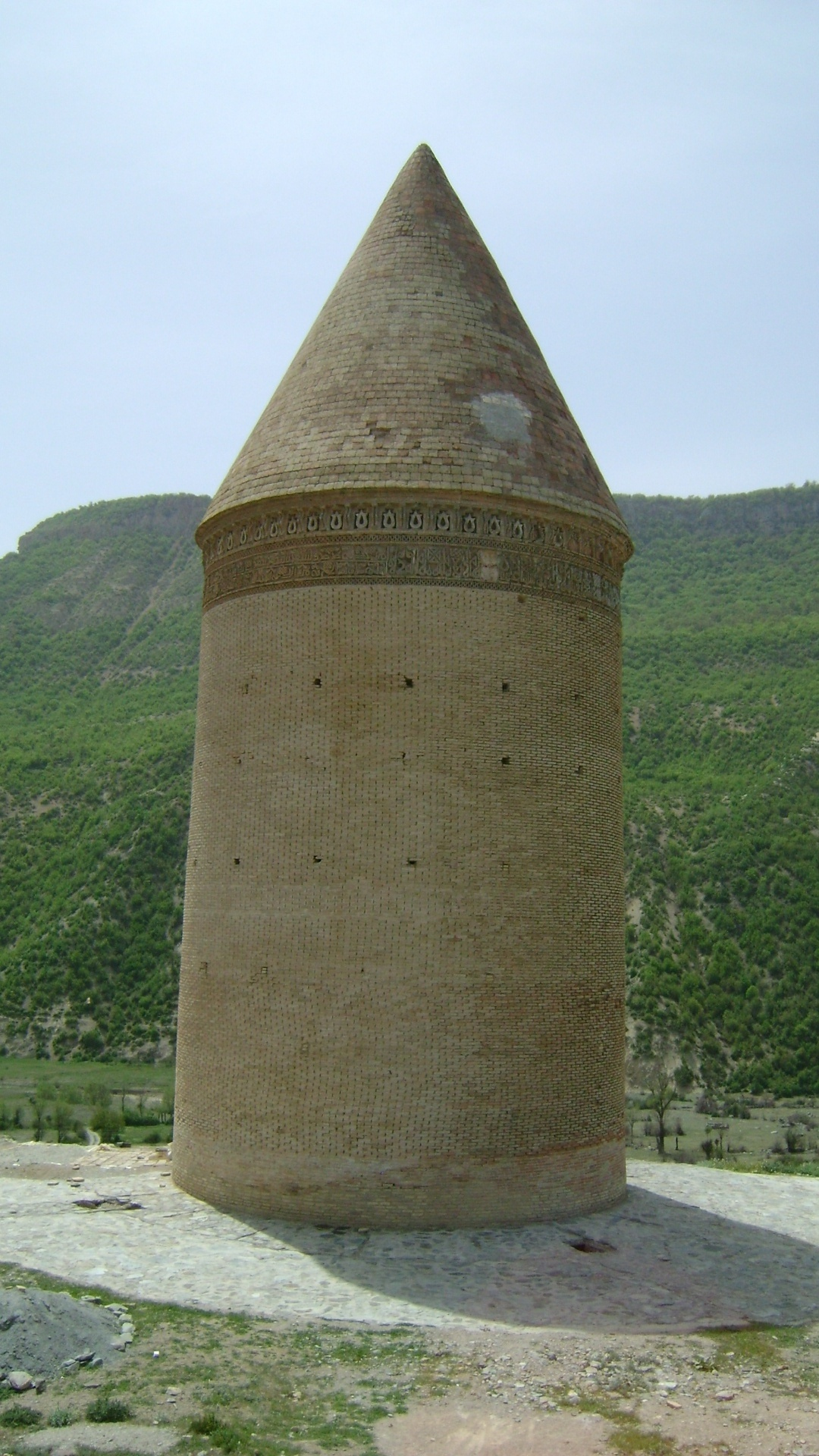
- Picture of the Mil-e Radkan, where Abu Ja'far Muhammad is buried.

Ruler of the Bavand dynasty
- Reign: ???–1027
- Predecessor: al-Marzuban
- Successor: Qarin II
- Died: 1028; Jibal
- Father: Vandarin
- Religion: Shia Islam

Abu Ja'far Muhammad (Persian: ابو جعفر محمد), was the ruler of the Bavand dynasty from an unknown date until his capture and defeat by the Kakuyids in 1027.

== Background ==
In 1006, the Bavand dynasty was put to an end by the Ziyarid ruler Qabus (r. 977–981 & 997–1012). Nevertheless, several Bavandid princes continued to rule in small local parts of Mazandaran. Abu Ja'far, a son of a certain Vandarin, is mentioned as the ruler of Bavand dynasty. It is not known if Abu Ja'far was the successor of Al-Marzuban or not. Abu Ja'far, during his reign, was a vassal of the Buyid ruler Majd al-Dawla (r. 997–1029), who was himself of Bavandid descent through his mother Sayyida Khatun.

== Reign ==
Ibn Fuladh, a Daylamite military officer, who claimed Qazvin for himself, revolted against Majd al-Dawla in 1016. Majd al-Dawla, however, refused to make him governor of Qazvin, which made Ibn Fuladh threaten him around the countryside of his capital in Ray. Majd al-Dawla then requested the aid of Abu Ja'far, who managed to defeat Ibn Fuladh and repel him from Ray. Ibn Fuladh then requested aid from the Ziyarid ruler Manuchihr (r. 1012–1031). Ibn Fuladh agreed to become Manuchihr's vassal in return for his aid. The following year, a combined army of Ibn Fuladh and Manuchihr besieged Ray, which forced Majd al-Dawla to make Ibn Fuladh the governor of Isfahan.

In 1023, the Kakuyid ruler Muhammad ibn Rustam Dushmanziyar (r. 1008–1041), who was himself of Bavandid descent, revolted against the Buyids, and seized Hamadan from the Buyid ruler Sama' al-Dawla (r. 1021–1023). He spent the following years in protecting his realm from invasions by the forces of Abu Ja'far. Five years later, Majd al-Dawla sent a combined Buyid-Bavandid army under Abu Ja'far and his two sons against Muhammad. Muhammad, however, managed win a great victory over the Buyid-Bavandid army at Nahavand, and managed to capture Abu Ja'far including his two sons. Abu Ja'far died one year later in prison, and after his death, the Bavandids disappear from sources, and are first later mentioned in 1057 under the Bavandid ruler Qarin II.

== The Mil-e Radkan ==
During his reign, Abu Ja'far ordered the construction of the Mil-e Radkan near Gorgan, where he was later buried. The building of the tower was completed in 1016, between 7 September-5 October—several inscriptions are written on the entrance, both in Arabic and Pahlavi, which states;

In the name of God. This is the palace of the amir, the important lord, Abu Ja'far Muhammad ibn Vandarin Bavand, client of the Commander of the Faithful. [It was ordered] in the month of Rabi II of the year 407 [7 September-5 October 1016].

Another inscription, states the following;

In the name of God. The ispahbad Abu Ja'far Muhammad ibn Vandarin Bavand, client of the Commander of the Faithful, may God honour him with forgiveness and satisfaction and paradise, ordered commencing the construction of this shrine during the days of [his] life in 407 [1016-1017]. It was finished in the year 411 of the Hijrah [1020-1021].

== Sources ==
- Frye, R. N. (1986). "Bāwand". The Encyclopedia of Islam, New Edition, Volume I: A–B. Leiden and New York: BRILL. p. 1110. ISBN 90-04-08114-3.
- Madelung, W. (1975). "The Minor Dynasties of Northern Iran". In Frye, R.N. (ed.). The Cambridge History of Iran, Volume 4: From the Arab Invasion to the Saljuqs. Cambridge: Cambridge University Press. pp. 198–249. ISBN 978-0-521-20093-6.
- Madelung, W. (1984). "ĀL-E BĀVAND (BAVANDIDS)". Encyclopaedia Iranica, Vol. I, Fasc. 7. London u.a.: Routledge & Kegan Paul. pp. 747–753. ISBN 90-04-08114-3.
- Bosworth, C. Edmund (1997). "EBN FŪLĀD". Encyclopaedia Iranica, Vol. VIII, Fasc. 1. London et al.: C. Edmund Bosworth. pp. 26–27.
- Bosworth, C. Edmund (1998). "KĀKUYIDS". Encyclopaedia Iranica, Vol. XV, Fasc. 4. London et al.: C. Edmund Bosworth. pp. 359–362.
- Babaie, Sussan; Grigor, Talinn (2015). Persian Kingship and Architecture: Strategies of Power in Iran from the Achaemenids to the Pahlavis. I.B.Tauris. pp. 1–288. ISBN 9780857734778.

Regnal titles
Preceded by al-Marzuban	Bavandid ruler ???–1027	Succeeded by Qarin II
