= Muhammad (Bavandid ruler) =

Bavand dynasty ruler (1249–1271)

Shams al-Muluk Muhammad of Tabaristan (شمس الملوک محمد) was the ruler of the Bavand dynasty from 1249 to 1271. He was the son and successor of Ardashir II of Tabaristan.

== Biography ==
Muhammad had close relations with his ally the Paduspanid Shahragim, and even married his daughter. During the reign of the Ilkhanid Abaqa Khan, Muhammad and Shahrigam were ordered to aid the Ilkhanids in the prolonged siege of the Gerdkuh fortress, which was held by the Ismailites. Muhammad and Shahragim deserted after some time, however. Abaqa Khan responded by invading Mazandaran. The two kings were then forgiven. Muhammad then joined the armies of the Ilkhanid, but was shortly arrested because of his recklessness. After hearing about Muhammad's imprisonment, Shahragim revolted against Abaqa, which resulted in the execution of Muhammad, who was succeeded by his brother Ali II of Tabaristan.

== Sources ==
- Bosworth, C. E. (1968). "The Political and Dynastic History of the Iranian World (A.D. 1000–1217)". In Frye, R.N. (ed.). The Cambridge History of Iran, Volume 5: The Saljuq and Mongol periods. Cambridge: Cambridge University Press. pp. 1–202. ISBN 0-521-06936-X.
- Madelung, W. (1975). "The Minor Dynasties of Northern Iran". In Frye, R.N. (ed.). The Cambridge History of Iran, Volume 4: From the Arab Invasion to the Saljuqs. Cambridge: Cambridge University Press. pp. 198–249. ISBN 978-0-521-20093-6.

Preceded by Ardashir II	Bavand ruler 1249–1271	Succeeded by Ali II
