= Ali II (Bavandid ruler) =

13th-century Bavandid ruler

Ali II (Persian: علی) was a ruler of the Bavand dynasty who ruled briefly in 1271. He was the brother and successor of Muhammad. Nothing more is known about him; he died in 1271, and was succeeded by his cousin Yazdagird of Tabaristan.

== Sources ==
- Madelung, W. (1984). "ĀL-E BĀVAND (BAVANDIDS)". Encyclopaedia Iranica, Vol. I, Fasc. 7. London u.a.: Routledge & Kegan Paul. pp. 747–753. ISBN 90-04-08114-3.

Preceded by Muhammad	Bavand ruler 1271	Succeeded by Yazdagird
