= Rustam II =

- Ispahbadh of Tabaristan / Bavand ruler

Bavand ruler
- Reign: 964–979
- Predecessor: Shahriyar II
- Successor: Al-Marzuban
- Born: Tabaristan (presumably)
- Died: 979
- House: Bavand dynasty (Kayusiyya branch)
- Father: Sharwin II
- Religion: Shia Islam (first Bavand ruler to adopt Shia Islam)

Rustam II (Persian: رستم), was the twelfth ruler of the Bavand dynasty from 964 to 979. He was the brother and successor of Shahriyar II.

Rustam was the son of Sharwin II. In 964, Shahriyar was deposed because of his pro-Ziyarid policies in favor of his pro-Buyid brother Rustam. Rustam was the first Bavand ruler who embraced Shia Islam. Shahriyar later tried to reclaim the Bavand throne by invading Tabaristan with a Samanid army in 968, but to no avail. Rustam died in 979, and was succeeded by his son Al-Marzuban.

== Sources ==
- Madelung, W. (1975). "The Minor Dynasties of Northern Iran". In Frye, R.N. (ed.). The Cambridge History of Iran, Volume 4: From the Arab Invasion to the Saljuqs. Cambridge: Cambridge University Press. pp. 198–249. ISBN 978-0-521-20093-6.
- Madelung, W. (1984). "ĀL-E BĀVAND (BAVANDIDS)". Encyclopaedia Iranica, Vol. I, Fasc. 7. London u.a.: Routledge & Kegan Paul. pp. 747–753. ISBN 90-04-08114-3.

Preceded by Shahriyar II	Bavand ruler 964–979	Succeeded by Al-Marzuban
