= Ardashir II (Bavandid ruler) =

Ardashir II (Persian: اردشیر) was the ruler of the Bavand dynasty from 1238 to 1249. His grandmother was a sister of Rustam V, and he was also related to the Nizari Ismaili Jalaluddin Hasan through his mother.

== Biography ==
In 1238, Ardashir restored Bavand rule in Mazandaran, and assumed the traditional Bavand title of ispahbadh. He died in 1249, and was succeeded by his son Muhammad.

== Sources ==
- Madelung, W. (1984). "ĀL-E BĀVAND (BAVANDIDS)". Encyclopaedia Iranica, Vol. I, Fasc. 7. London u.a.: Routledge & Kegan Paul. pp. 747–753. ISBN 90-04-08114-3.
- Frye, R.N. (1975). "The Saljuq and Mongol periods". In Frye, R.N. (ed.). The Cambridge History of Iran, Volume 5: The Iranian world. Cambridge: Cambridge University Press. pp. 1–659. ISBN 0-521-20093-8.

| Preceded by Mongol occupation | Bavand ruler 1238–1249 | Succeeded by Muhammad |
