= Sharwin II =

Sharwin II (Persian: شروین), was the tenth ruler of the Bavand dynasty from 896 to 930.

In 896, Sharwin's father, Rustam I, was tortured to death by Rafi ibn Harthama, who then divided Rustam's domains in Tabaristan with Zaydid Muhammad ibn Zayd. Sharwin thus succeeded Rustam I as the head of the Bavand family. In 900, Sharwin, along with the Karenid ruler Shahriyar ibn Baduspan, aided the Samanids in conquering Tabaristan. After the successful Samanid conquest, Sharwin's domains were restored to him. However, in 914, Hasan al-Utrush managed to re-establish Zaydid control over Tabaristan, and forced Sharwin accept the Zaydids as his overlord and pay tribute to them. Sharwin seems to have later aided Makan ibn Kaki in his campaign to conquer Khorasan from the Samanids in 930, where Sharwin shortly died, and was succeeded by his son Shahriyar II. Vushmgir, who would become the overlord of Tabaristan in 935, married Sharwin's daughter after the latter's death.

== Sources ==
- Madelung, W. (1975). "The Minor Dynasties of Northern Iran". In Frye, R.N. (ed.). The Cambridge History of Iran, Volume 4: From the Arab Invasion to the Saljuqs. Cambridge: Cambridge University Press. pp. 198–249. ISBN 978-0-521-20093-6.
- Madelung, W. (1984). "ĀL-E BĀVAND (BAVANDIDS)". Encyclopaedia Iranica, Vol. I, Fasc. 7. London u.a.: Routledge & Kegan Paul. pp. 747–753. ISBN 90-04-08114-3.
- Frye, R.N. (1975). "The Saljuq and Mongol periods". In Frye, R.N. (ed.). The Cambridge History of Iran, Volume 5: The Iranian world. Cambridge: Cambridge University Press. pp. 1–659. ISBN 0-521-20093-8.

| Preceded by Rustam I | Bavand ruler 896–930 | Succeeded by Shahriyar II |
