= Shahriyar IV =

Shahriyar IV شهریار
- Husam al-Dawla
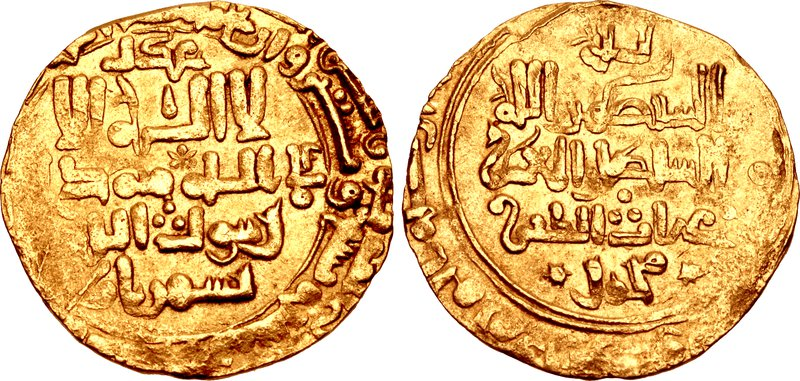
- Coin of Shahryar IV.

King of Mazandaran
- Reign: 1074–1114
- Predecessor: Qarin II
- Successor: Qarin III
- Born: 1039; Mazandaran
- Died: 1114 (aged 74 or 75); Tamisha, Mazandaran
- Issue: Qarin III; Ali I Rustam; Yazdagird; Bahram
- Dynasty: Bavand dynasty
- Father: Qarin II
- Religion: Twelver Shia Islam

Sheharyar IV (Persian: شهریار), also known by his honorific title Husam al-Dawla (حسام الدوله), was the king of the Bavand dynasty of Mazandaran, ruling from 1074 to 1114.

After having succeeded his father Qarin II in 1074, Shahriyar IV immediately moved the capital to Sari, which it would remain till 1210. A few decades later, he briefly waged a war against his overlords, the Seljuk Empire. Peace was made, and Shahriyar IV's son Qarin III married a daughter of the Seljuk Sultan Muhammad I.

Sheharyar IV's rule was shortly usurped by Qarin III, who, however, eventually restored him as king. Sheharyar, old and ill, spent the rest of his reign as a figurehead, whilst Qarin III was the de facto ruler of the kingdom, and finally ascended the throne after Shahriyar IV's death in 1114.

== Reign ==
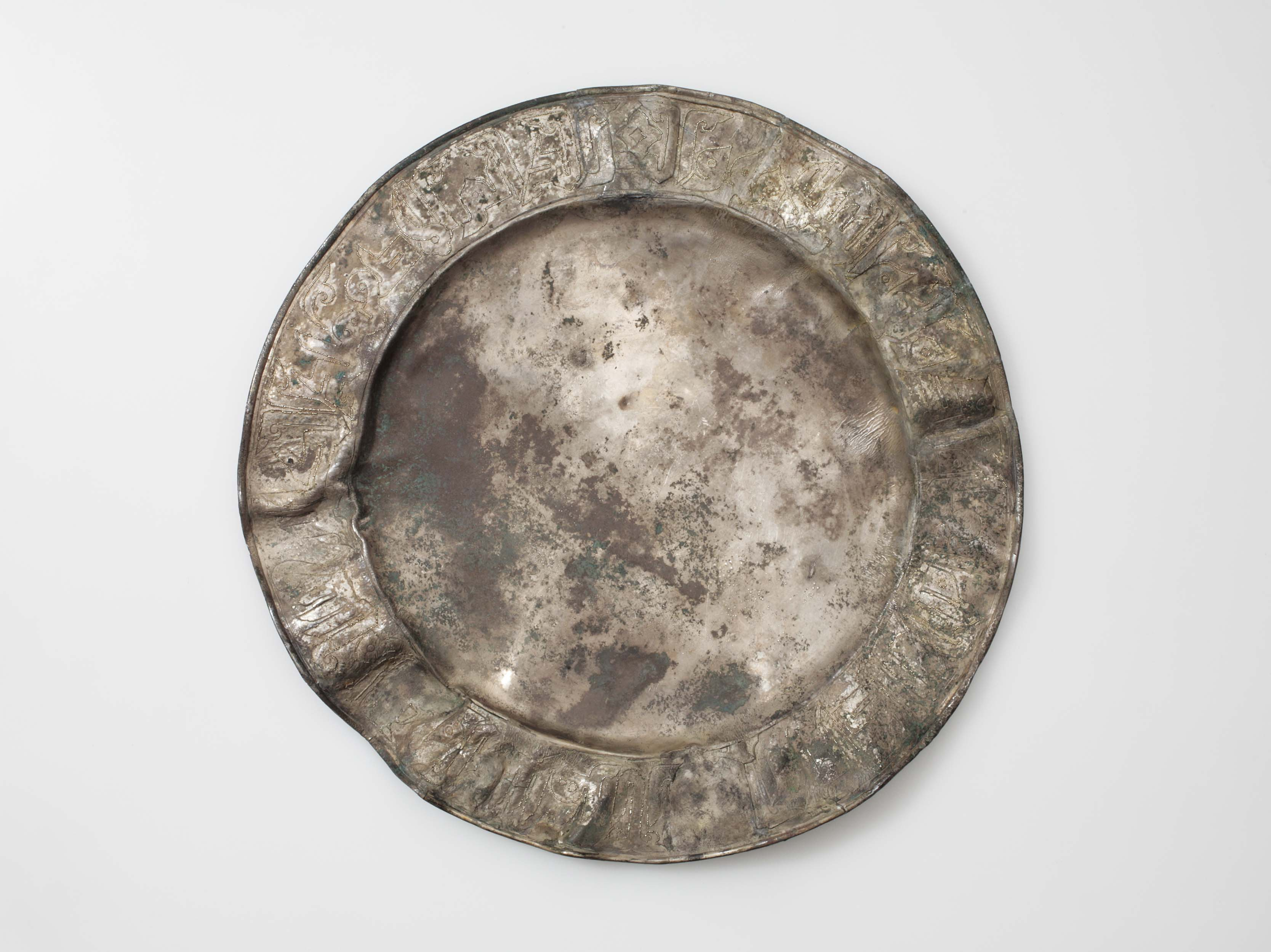
An otherwise plain dish, except for the bold Kufic inscription on the rim dedicated to Shahriyar IV. Engraved and set with gold granules it reads; "wealth and well-being and perpetual glory to the great Ispahhad Husam al-Dawlah Shahriyar ibn Qarin, may God give him long life". Created in northern Iran in the 11th century

Sheharyar was born in 1039, and in 1074, he ascended the Bavandid throne, taking the traditional title of ispahbadh of Mazandaran. He also moved the Bavand capital to Sari. Like his father, Sheharyar IV was a vassal of the Seljuk Empire.

In 1106, the Seljuk Sultan Muhammad I conquered the Ismaili fortress of Shahdiz, and ordered Sheharyar to participate in the campaign against Ismailis. Sheharyar, greatly angered and feeling offended by the message Muhammad sent him, refused to aid him against the Ismailis. Shortly after the sultan sent an army headed by Amir Chavli into Mazandaran. Sheharyar shortly called upon the aid of his vassals, which included the Qarinvand ruler Amir Mahdi. Shahriyar was also joined by his son Qarin III. He shortly defeated the army of Amir Chavli. Muhammad then sent a letter, which requested Sheharyar to send one of his sons child to the Seljuk court in Isfahan. He sent his son Ali I, who impressed Muhammad so much that he offered him his daughter in marriage, but Ali refused and told him to grant the honor to his brother and heir of the Bavand dynasty, Qarin III. Qarin III then went to Isfahan court and married her. After his return to Sari, however, he began claiming the Bavand throne for himself, and started abusing his father Shahriyar and his servants. Shahriyar then moved to Amol and later Rudsar, where he built a Khanqah, and devoted himself to religion. However, when he got sick, Qarin III apologized and restored him as the ruler of the Bavand dynasty.

Qarin III's refusal to submit to the Seljuk atabeg of Ray, made the atabeg offer Ali an opportunity to conquer Mazandaran, to which he agreed. Shahriyar quickly sided with Qarin III and convinced Ali to withdraw. Nevertheless, the strife continued among the two brothers. Ali later went to Marw and joined the Seljuk prince Ahmad Sanjar, the ruler of Khorasan. Ahmad Sanjar was preparing for an expedition to the west in order to take control of Gorgan, but an attack made by Muhammad Khan on the Seljuk borders, forced Ahmad Sanjar to move east in order to repel Muhammad Khan. This allowed Qarin III to capture Gorgan while Shahriyar stayed in Tamisha. Shahriyar later fell ill and died in 1114 at Tamisha and was officially succeeded by his son Qarin III, who already held power over the Bavand kingdom, while Shahriyar was a figurehead.

== Offspring ==
Shahriyar IV had a least five sons;

- Qarin III, Bavandid king from 1114 to 1117.
- Ali I, Bavandid king from 1118 to 1142.
- Rustam
- Yazdagird
- Bahram, Bavandid pretender, murdered in 1121 at Nishapur.

== Sources ==
- Madelung, W. (1975). "The Minor Dynasties of Northern Iran". In Frye, R.N. (ed.). The Cambridge History of Iran, Volume 4: From the Arab Invasion to the Saljuqs. Cambridge: Cambridge University Press. pp. 198–249. ISBN 978-0-521-20093-6.
- Bosworth, C. E. (1968). "The Political and Dynastic History of the Iranian World (A.D. 1000–1217)". In Frye, R. N. (ed.). The Cambridge History of Iran, Volume 5: The Saljuq and Mongol periods. Cambridge: Cambridge University Press. pp. 1–202. ISBN 0-521-06936-X.
- Madelung, W. (1984). "ĀL-E BĀVAND (BAVANDIDS)". Encyclopaedia Iranica, Vol. I, Fasc. 7. London u.a.: Routledge & Kegan Paul. pp. 747–753. ISBN 90-04-08114-3.

Regnal titles
Preceded by Qarin II	Bavandid ruler 1074–1114	Succeeded by Qarin III
