= Shahriyar III =

Ruler of Bavand dynasty

- Ispahbadh of Tabaristan / Bavand ruler

Bavand ruler
- Reign: 986-987; briefly in 998
- Predecessor: Sharwin III
- Successor: Al-Marzuban (after first reign)
- Born: Tabaristan (presumably)
- Died: 1000; Ray
- House: Bavand dynasty
- Father: Prince Dara

Shahriyar III (Persian: شهریار), was the sixteenth ruler of the Bavand dynasty from 986 to 987, and briefly in 998 after a short disruption during his reign. He was the nephew and successor of Sharwin III.

Shahriyar III was the son of a certain Bavandid prince named Dara. In 986, after the death of the Bavandid ruler Rustam II, his son al-Marzuban ascended the Bavandid throne. There have been several confusions about the reign of the Bavandid kings after the death of Rustam II. In 986, al-Marzuban is no longer mentioned as the ruler of the Bavand dynasty, and a certain Sharwin III is instead mentioned as the ruler of the dynasty. Shahriyar III is later mentioned as the ruler of the Bavand dynasty in the following year. Al-Marzuban is then once again mentioned in sources, as having deposed Shahriyar III, and restored himself as the ruler of the Bavand dynasty. In 998, Shahriyar III returned to Tabaristan with Ziyarid aid, and captured Shahriyarkuh from al-Marzuban. However, al-Marzuban, with Buyid aid, managed to quickly repel him from the city. Shahriyar III shortly made another counter-attack, and defeated al-Marzuban. Shahriyar III then ascended the Bavandid throne, and declared independence from Ziyarid rule. al-Marzuban used this opportunity to become the vassal of the Ziyarids, and regain his throne. Shahriyar III then fled to Ray, where he died in 1000.

== Sources ==
- Madelung, W. (1975). "The Minor Dynasties of Northern Iran". In Frye, R.N. (ed.). The Cambridge History of Iran, Volume 4: From the Arab Invasion to the Saljuqs. Cambridge: Cambridge University Press. pp. 198–249. ISBN 978-0-521-20093-6.
- Madelung, W. (1984). "ĀL-E BĀVAND (BAVANDIDS)". Encyclopaedia Iranica, Vol. I, Fasc. 7. London u.a.: Routledge & Kegan Paul. pp. 747–753. ISBN 90-04-08114-3.

Regnal titles
Preceded by Sharwin III	Bavandid ruler 986–987	Succeeded by al-Marzuban
Preceded by al-Marzuban	Bavandid ruler 998	Succeeded by al-Marzuban
