= Rustam III =

Rustam III (Persian: رستم), was the ruler of the Bavand dynasty from 1117 to 1118. He was the son and successor of Qarin III.

Rustam III, shortly after his accession of the Bavandid throne, was challenged by his uncle Ali I, who claimed the Bavandid throne for himself. The Seljuq Sultan Muhammad I, then requested the two Bavandid rivals to appear in the Seljuq court of Isfahan. Rustam, however, refused, but later changed his mind and went to Isfahan, where he shortly fell ill and died. According to some sources, Rustam was poisoned by his stepmother, the sister of Muhammad I, who wanted to marry Ali I. Ali I then ascended the Bavandid throne.

== Sources ==
- Bosworth, C. E. (1968). "The Political and Dynastic History of the Iranian World (A.D. 1000–1217)". In Frye, R. N. (ed.). The Cambridge History of Iran, Volume 5: The Saljuq and Mongol periods. Cambridge: Cambridge University Press. pp. 1–202. ISBN 0-521-06936-X.
- Madelung, W. (1984). "ĀL-E BĀVAND (BAVANDIDS)". Encyclopaedia Iranica, Vol. I, Fasc. 7. London u.a.: Routledge & Kegan Paul. pp. 747–753. ISBN 90-04-08114-3.

Preceded by Qarin III	Bavand ruler 1117–1118	Succeeded by Ali I
