= Hasan I (Bavandid ruler) =

Hasan I (Persian: حسن) was the ruler of the Bavand dynasty from 1165 to 1173. He was the son and successor of Shah Ghazi Rustam IV. He was murdered in 1173 by his Turkic slave-soldiers (ghilman) and was succeeded by his son Ardashir I.

== Sources ==
- Bosworth, C. E. (1968). "The Political and Dynastic History of the Iranian World (A.D. 1000–1217)". In Frye, R. N. (ed.). The Cambridge History of Iran, Volume 5: The Saljuq and Mongol periods. Cambridge: Cambridge University Press. pp. 1–202. ISBN 0-521-06936-X.
- Madelung, W. (1984). "ĀL-E BĀVAND (BAVANDIDS)". Encyclopaedia Iranica, Vol. I, Fasc. 7. London u.a.: Routledge & Kegan Paul. pp. 747–753. ISBN 90-04-08114-3.
- Madelung, W. (2010). "BADUSPANIDS". Encyclopaedia Iranica, Online Edition.

Preceded by Shah Ghazi Rustam IV	Bavandid ruler 1165–1173	Succeeded by Ardashir I
