= Tammisha =

Medieval city in Tabaristan

Tammisha (also spelled Tamisha or Tammishe; Persian: تَمیشَه, romanized: Tamīšah) was a medieval city in Tabaristan (north of Iran) on the foot of the Alborz mountain, serving as a place of high importance, often being the residence of princes. The city bordered the region of Gurgan, and featured a prominent wall, the Tammisha Wall, built in the Sasanian period. It was 11 kilometres (6.8 mi) long and was stretched from the Gorgan Bay.

== Sources ==
- Bivar, A. D. H.; Fehérvári, G. (1999). "The Walls of Tammīs̱ẖa". Bulletin (British Society for Middle Eastern Studies). 13: 77–82. JSTOR 4299573.
- Rekavandi, Hamid Omrani; Sauer, Eberhard W. (2013). "Tamiša Wall". Encyclopaedia Iranica.
