= List of mountains in Iran =

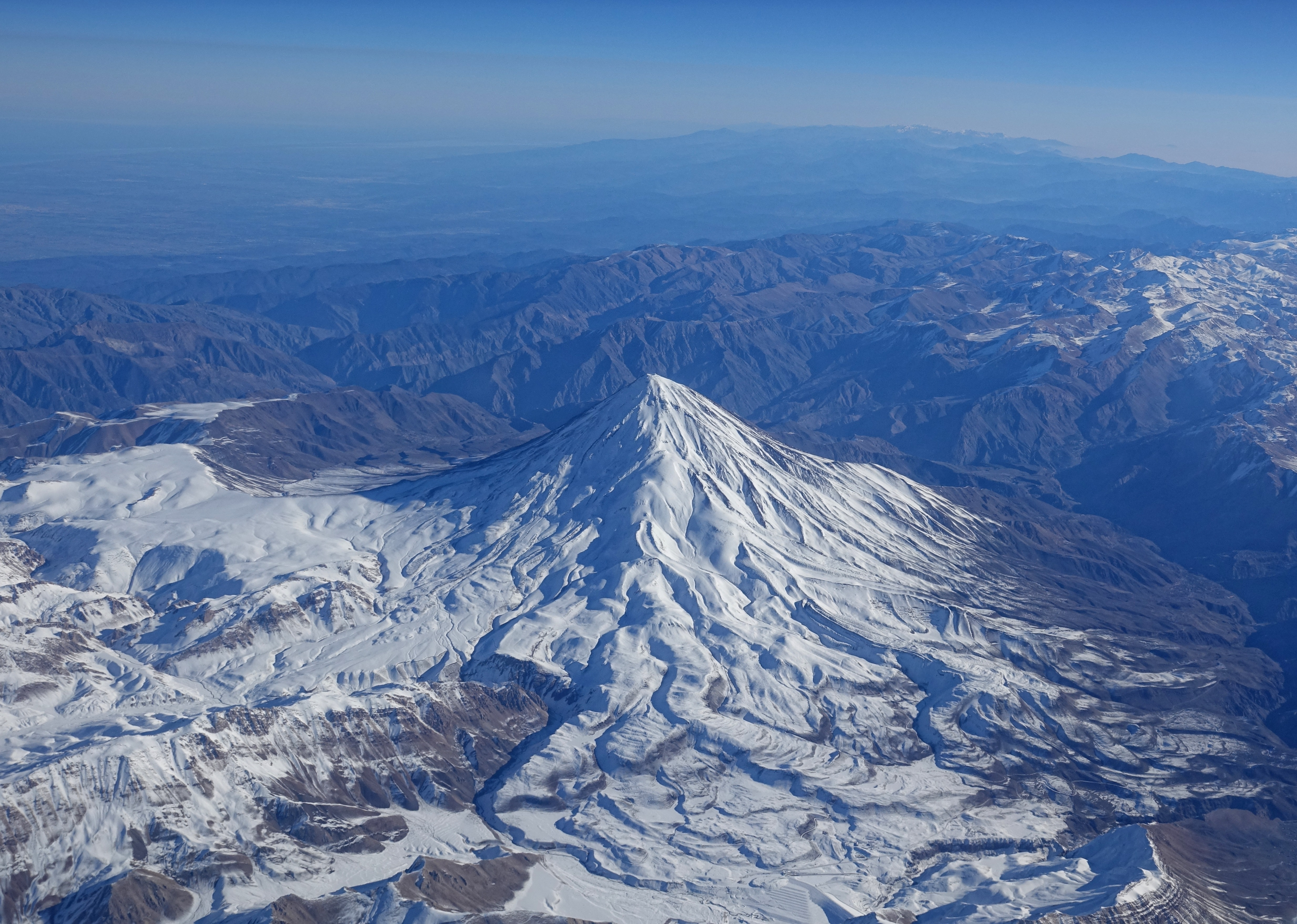
Damavand mount in Mazandaran

The highest mountains in Iran include Damavand, Alam-Kuh, Sabalan, Takht-e Soleyman, Azad Kuh, Zard-Kuh, and Shir Kuh.

This is a list of mountains in the country of Iran.

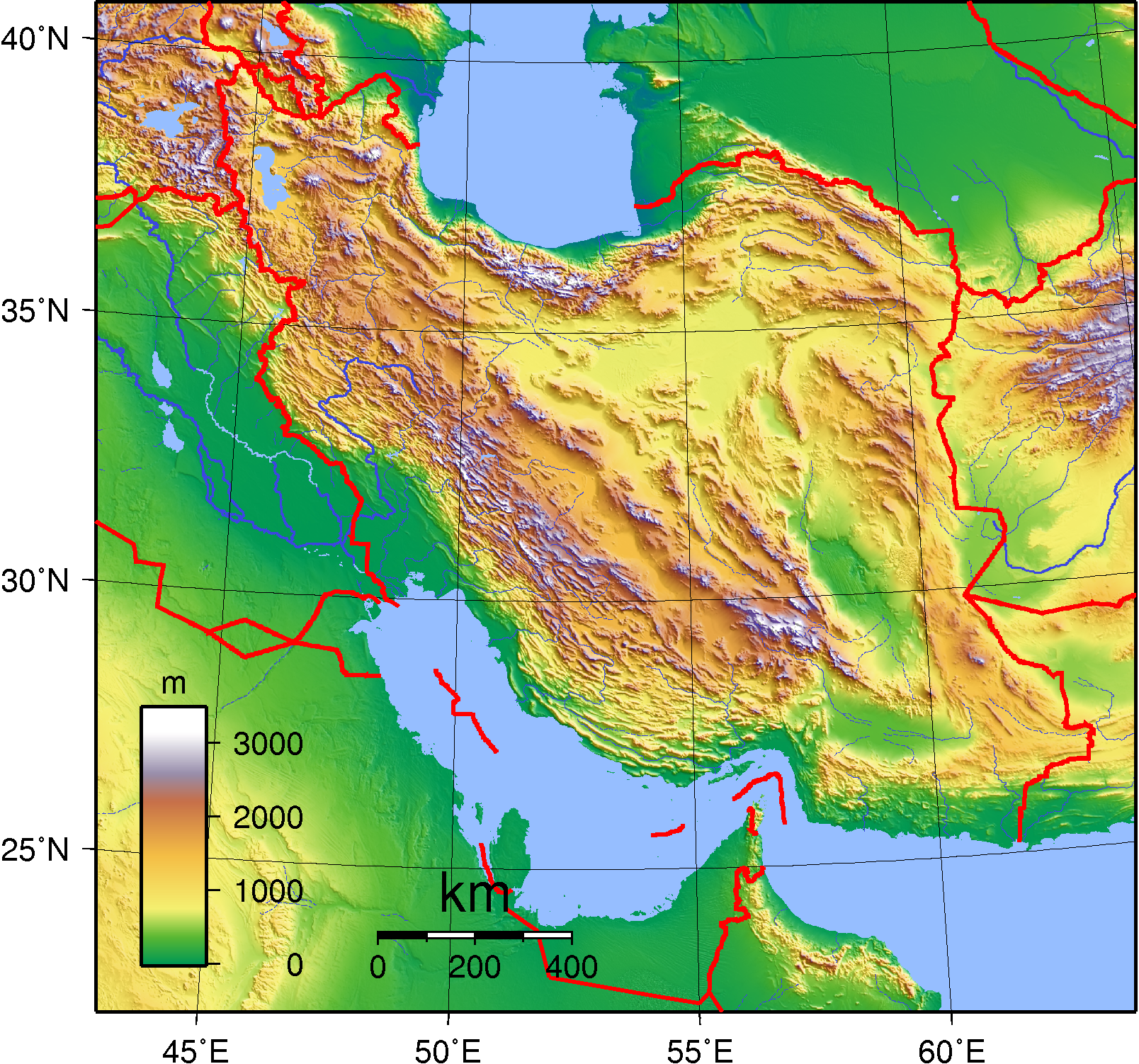
Topographical maps showing the mountain ranges of Iran

By clicking on the symbols at the head of the table the individual columns may be sorted.

Ranking	Photograph	Mountain	Height (m)	Range
1		Mount Damavand	5,610	Middle Alborz Mountains
2		Alam-Kuh	4,850	Takht-e Suleyman Mountains
3	Mount Sabalan in July 2006	Sabalan	4,811	
4		North Khersan	4,680	Takht-e Suleyman Mountains
5		South Khersan	4,659	Takht-e Suleyman Mountains
6		Mount Takht-e Suleyman	4,659	Takht-e Suleyman Mountains
7		Siahsang	4,604	Takht-e Suleyman Mountains
8		Haft Khan	4,537	Takht-e Suleyman Mountains
9		Chaloon	4,516	Takht-e Suleyman Mountains
10		South Siahgook	4,500	Takht-e Suleyman Mountains
11		Hazaran	4,501	Central Iranian plateau
12		Siah-Kaman	4,472	Takht-e Suleyman Mountains
13		Shaneh-Kuh	4,465	Takht-e Suleyman Mountains
14		North Siahgook	4,445	Takht-e Suleyman Mountains
15		Kaloo	4,412	Takht-e Suleyman Mountains
16		Dena	4,409	Zagros Mountains
17		Gardoon Kuh	4,402	Takht-e Suleyman Mountains
18		Kuh-e Shah (Lalehzar)	4,384	Zagros Mountains
19		Kholeno	4,375	Middle Alborz Mountains
20	Azadkuh (4,375 m)	Azad Kuh	4,375	Middle Alborz Mountains
21		Paloon Gardan	4,375	Middle Alborz Mountains
22		Nazer	4,350	Middle Alborz Mountains
23		Mian-Seh-Chal	4,348	Takht-e Suleyman Mountains
24		Lashgarak	4,256	Takht-e Suleyman Mountains
25		Sialan	4,250	West Alborz Mountains
26		Mount Chlchama	4,250	North Zagros Mountains
27		Palvar	4,229	Zagros Mountains
28	Kolunchin, the highest peak in Zardkuh mountains. (4,221 m)	Zard-Kuh	4,221	Zagros Mountains
29		Koloon Bastak	4,200	Middle Alborz Mountains
30		Shah Alborz	4,200	West Alborz Mountains
31		Zarin Kuh	4,200	Takht-e Suleyman Mountains
32		Khashechal	4,180	West Alborz Mountains
33		Jupar	4,150	Zagros Mountains
34		Sarakchal	4,150	Middle Alborz Mountains
35		Naz	4,108	West Alborz Mountains
36		Varevasht	4,100	Middle Alborz Mountains
37		Kharsang	4,100	Middle Alborz Mountains
38		Shir Kuh	4,050	Zagros Mountains
39		Kahar (Mountain)	4,050	West Alborz Mountains
40		Alanehsar	4,050	Takht-e Suleyman Mountains
41		Oshtorankuh	4,050	Zagros Mountains
42		Shahankuh	4,040	Zagros Mountains
43		Korma Kuh	4,020	Takht-e Suleyman Mountains
44		Pasand Kuh	4,000	Takht-e Suleyman Mountains
45		Siahleiz	3,975	Takht-e Suleyman Mountains
46		Bel Mountain	3,943	Zagros Mountains
47		Taftan	3,941	Baluchestan Mountains
48	Tochal mountains, Tehran (3,933 m)	Tochal	3,933	Middle Alborz Mountains
49		Mehrchal	3,920	Middle Alborz Mountains
50		Dalankuh	3,915	Zagros Mountains
51		Shahvar	3,890	East Alborz Mountains
52		Mount Bahr Aseman	3,886	Sahand-Bazman range
53		Karkas	3,870	Karkas Mountains
54		Atash Kuh	3,850	Middle Alborz Mountains
55		Shah Neshin (Mountain)	3,850	Middle Alborz Mountains
56		Sahand	3,707	Azerbaijan Mountains
57		Sataple	3,669	Zagros Mountains
58		Garrin	3,623	Zagros Mountains
59		West Alborz Mountains	3,609	
60		Alvand Kuh	3,580	Zagros Mountains
61		Bazman	3,490	Baluchestan Mountains
62	Paraw	Paraw	3,415	central Zagros Mountains
63	Shaho mountain	Shaho	3,390	central Zagros Mountains
64		Tsikhe	3,350	Zagros Mountains
65		Qezel Arsalan	3,250	Zagros Mountains
66		Jahanbin	3,220	Zagros Mountains
67	Mt. Binalud view in winter from Bāghrud Road (south of the mountain)(3,211 m)	Binalud	3,220	Middle Alborz Mountains
68		Birk Mountain	2,740	Baluchistan Mountains
69		Baghdasht Peak	2,500	
70		Sharbak	1,694	Middle Alborz Mountains
71		Mount Do Baradaran	1,235	Central Iran

== See also ==
- List of Iranian four-thousanders
