= Sarakchal =

Mountain in the central Alborz, Iran

- Location within Iran

Highest point
- Elevation: 4,210 m (13,810 ft)
- Prominence: 314 m (1,030 ft)
- Coordinates: 36.0284°N 51.5394°E

Naming
- Native name: سرکچال (Persian)

Geography
- Location: Tehran Province, Iran
- Parent range: Kholeno massif, central Alborz

Sarakchal (Persian: سرکچال) is a mountain in the Kholeno massif of the central Alborz, in Tehran Province, Iran, north of the village of Shemshak. One of the Iranian four-thousanders, it is a popular mountaineering destination near Tehran.

== Geography ==
The mountain has three summits aligned along an east–west ridge: the main peak, Sarakchal I, at about 4,210 metres (13,810 ft), and two subsidiary western summits, Sarakchal II (4,152 metres (13,622 ft)) and Sarakchal III (4,124 metres (13,530 ft)), both also exceeding 4,000 metres (13,000 ft). PeakVisor gives the main summit as 4,194 metres (13,760 ft) with a topographic prominence of 314 metres (1,030 ft). To the west the ridge runs towards Koloon Bastak, and to the east it connects over the Varzab pass towards Kholeno (4,375 metres (14,354 ft)), the highest point of Tehran Province.

== Climbing ==
The usual summer route follows the southern ridge from the Shemshak chairlift and the village of Sepidestan, passing the Lajni shelter (پناهگاه لجنی) at about 3,540 metres (11,610 ft); it is non-technical but long. Several other routes exist, including a ridge traverse from Koloon Bastak and a winter line deliberately routed to avoid avalanche couloirs. In winter the climb becomes a serious undertaking requiring ice axe, crampons and rope.

In April 2020 a climber died on Sarakchal when a snow cornice broke during the descent of the ridge and he was carried down the steep north face by an avalanche; three companions survived.

== Ecology ==
Sarakchal lies within the Central Alborz Protected Area, a large protected zone of the central Alborz administered by the Department of Environment.

== See also ==
- List of Iranian four-thousanders
