= Siahsang =

Mountain in Iran

- Location within Iran

Highest point
- Elevation: 4,606 m (15,112 ft)
- Coordinates: 36.3731°N 50.9772°E

Naming
- Native name: سیاه‌سنگ (Persian)

Geography
- Location: Mazandaran Province, Iran
- Parent range: Takht-e Suleyman Massif of the central Alborz

Siahsang (Persian: سیاه‌سنگ, also romanized Siah Sang) is a mountain in the Takht-e Suleyman Massif of the central Alborz, in Mazandaran Province, Iran. One of the Iranian four-thousanders, it rises to 4,606 metres (15,112 ft). The massif's highest summit is Alam-Kuh (4,850 metres (15,910 ft)), a major centre of Iranian mountaineering.

== See also ==
- List of Iranian four-thousanders
