= Chaloon =

Mountain in Iran

- Location within Iran

Highest point
- Elevation: 4,516 m (14,816 ft)
- Prominence: 103 m (338 ft)
- Coordinates: 36.3824°N 50.9901°E

Naming
- Native name: چالون (Persian)

Geography
- Location: Mazandaran Province, Iran
- Parent range: Takht-e Suleyman Massif of the central Alborz

Chaloon (Persian: چالون, also romanized Chalun) is a mountain in the Takht-e Suleyman Massif of the central Alborz, in Mazandaran Province, Iran. One of the Iranian four-thousanders, it rises to about 4,516 metres (14,816 ft) (14,800 ft according to PeakVisor) and has a topographic prominence of about 103 metres (338 ft). The massif's highest summit is Alam-Kuh (4,850 metres (15,910 ft)), a major centre of Iranian mountaineering.

== See also ==
- List of Iranian four-thousanders
