= Korma Kuh =

- Location within Iran

Highest point
- Elevation: 4,020 m (13,190 ft)
- Prominence: 345 m (1,132 ft)
- Coordinates: 36.4567°N 51.0046°E

Naming
- Native name: کرما (Persian)

Geography
- Location: Mazandaran Province, Iran
- Parent range: Takht-e Suleyman Massif of the central Alborz

Korma Kuh (Persian: کرما, also romanized Kormā or Kormakooh) is a mountain in the Takht-e Suleyman Massif of the central Alborz, in Mazandaran Province, Iran. One of the Iranian four-thousanders, it lies on the ridgeline connected to the main Takht-e Suleyman summit and rises to about 4,020 metres (13,190 ft) (about 4,009 metres (13,153 ft) by some sources), with a topographic prominence of about 345 metres (1,132 ft). The massif's highest summit is Alam-Kuh (4,850 metres (15,910 ft)), a major centre of Iranian mountaineering.

== See also ==
- List of Iranian four-thousanders
