= Paloon Gardan =

- Location within Iran

Highest point
- Elevation: 4,256 m (13,963 ft)
- Prominence: 189 m (620 ft)
- Coordinates: 36.0857°N 51.5870°E

Naming
- Native name: پالون گردن (Persian)

Geography
- Location: Tehran Province, Iran
- Parent range: Kholeno massif, central Alborz

Paloon Gardan (Persian: پالون گردن, also romanized Palun Gardan) is a mountain in the Kholeno massif of the central Alborz, in Tehran Province, Iran. It is one of the Iranian four-thousanders, with an elevation reported at between about 4,243 metres (13,921 ft) (PeakVisor) and 4,256 metres (13,963 ft), and a topographic prominence of about 189 metres (620 ft).

== See also ==
- List of Iranian four-thousanders
