= Palvar =

Ultra-prominent mountain in Kerman Province, Iran

- Location within Iran

Highest point
- Elevation: 4,229 m (13,875 ft)
- Prominence: 1,970 m (6,460 ft)
- Listing: Ultra
- Coordinates: 30.0700°N 57.4658°E

Naming
- Native name: پلوار (Persian)

Geography
- Location: Kerman Province, Iran
- Parent range: Hazaran massif

Palvar (Persian: پلوار) is a mountain in Kerman Province, Iran, in the Hazaran massif of the south-eastern highlands, about 45 kilometres (28 mi) from the city of Kerman. Rising to 4,229 metres (13,875 ft), it is an ultra-prominent peak and one of the most prominent summits in the country.

== Geography ==
Palvar lies in the Hazaran massif, part of the volcanic belt of south-eastern Iran. Its nearest higher neighbour is Kuh-e Hezar (4,501 metres (14,767 ft)), the highest peak of the massif, about 65 kilometres (40 mi) to the south-south-west. The peak is reached from the town of Mahan and nearby villages such as Darbar and Bidestan.

== Prominence ==
With a topographic prominence of about 1,970 metres (6,460 ft) above a key col of 2,259 metres (7,411 ft), Palvar qualifies as an ultra-prominent peak (a summit with prominence of at least 1,500 metres (4,900 ft)), and ranks among the highest by prominence in Iran.

== Climbing ==
Palvar is regarded as one of the more demanding ascents in Iran and is sometimes nicknamed the "Damavand of Kerman". The usual approach runs from Mahan up to the village of Bidestan, with the upper route crossing an exposed blade-like ridge known locally as Pol-e Sirat; the best season for an ascent is from spring to early autumn. Because of the terrain and weather, climbers have repeatedly been stranded or injured on the mountain. In November 2024, rescuers carried out a 23-hour operation, including a helicopter evacuation, to bring down an injured climber, and on other occasions groups of climbers caught out on the Palvar range have had to be rescued.

== See also ==
- List of Iranian four-thousanders
- Ultra-prominent peak
