= Alanehsar =

- Location within Iran

Highest point
- Elevation: 4,050 m (13,290 ft)
- Coordinates: 36.3146°N 50.9963°E

Naming
- Native name: آلانه‌سر (Persian)

Geography
- Location: Mazandaran Province, Iran
- Parent range: Takht-e Suleyman Massif of the central Alborz

Alanehsar (Persian: آلانه‌سر, also romanized Ālāneh-Sar) is a mountain in the Takht-e Suleyman Massif of the central Alborz, in Mazandaran Province, Iran. It is one of the Iranian four-thousanders, rising to about 4,050 metres (13,290 ft). The massif's highest summit is Alam-Kuh (4,850 metres (15,910 ft)), a major centre of Iranian mountaineering.

== See also ==
- List of Iranian four-thousanders
