= Kalu, Takht-e Suleyman Massif =

Kalu
- Location within Iran

Highest point
- Elevation: 4,412 m (14,475 ft)
- Prominence: 305 m (1,001 ft)
- Coordinates: 36.4455°N 50.9491°E

Naming
- Native name: کالو (Persian)

Geography
- Location: Mazandaran Province, Iran
- Parent range: Takht-e Suleyman Massif of the central Alborz

Kalu (Persian: کالو, also romanized Kaloo) is a mountain in the Takht-e Suleyman Massif of the central Alborz, in Mazandaran Province, Iran. One of the Iranian four-thousanders, it rises to about 4,412 metres (14,475 ft) with a topographic prominence of about 305 metres (1,001 ft). The peak is also recorded under the name Kalahoo (کالاهو) in some geographic databases. The massif's highest summit is Alam-Kuh (4,850 metres (15,910 ft)), a major centre of Iranian mountaineering.

== See also ==
- List of Iranian four-thousanders
