= Gardoon Kuh =

Mountain in Iran

- Location within Iran

Highest point
- Elevation: 4,402 m (14,442 ft)
- Prominence: 113 m (371 ft)
- Coordinates: 36.3434°N 50.9585°E

Naming
- Native name: گردون‌کوه (Persian)

Geography
- Location: Mazandaran Province, Iran
- Parent range: Takht-e Suleyman Massif of the central Alborz

Gardoon Kuh (Persian: گردون‌کوه) is a mountain in the Takht-e Suleyman Massif of the central Alborz, in Mazandaran Province, Iran. One of the Iranian four-thousanders, it rises to about 4,402 metres (14,442 ft) with a topographic prominence of about 113 metres (371 ft). The massif's highest summit is Alam-Kuh (4,850 metres (15,910 ft)), a major centre of Iranian mountaineering.

== See also ==
- List of Iranian four-thousanders
