= Pasand Kuh =

- Location within Iran

Highest point
- Elevation: 4,000 m (13,000 ft)
- Coordinates: 36.4019°N 51.0169°E

Naming
- Native name: پسنده کوه (Persian)

Geography
- Location: Mazandaran Province, Iran
- Parent range: Takht-e Suleyman Massif of the central Alborz

Pasand Kuh (Persian: پسنده کوه) is a mountain in the Takht-e Suleyman Massif of the central Alborz, in Mazandaran Province, Iran. It is one of the Iranian four-thousanders, with an elevation of about 4,000 metres (13,000 ft). The massif's highest summit is Alam-Kuh (4,850 metres (15,910 ft)), a major centre of Iranian mountaineering.

== See also ==
- List of Iranian four-thousanders
