= Haft Khan =

- Location within Iran

Highest point
- Elevation: 4,539 m (14,892 ft)
- Prominence: 130 m (430 ft)
- Coordinates: 36.3713°N 50.9381°E

Naming
- Native name: هفت خوان (Persian)

Geography
- Location: Mazandaran Province, Iran
- Parent range: Takht-e Suleyman Massif of the central Alborz

Haft Khan (Persian: هفت خوان) is a mountain in the Takht-e Suleyman Massif of the central Alborz, in Mazandaran Province, Iran. One of the Iranian four-thousanders, it rises to 4,539 metres (14,892 ft) with a topographic prominence of about 130 metres (430 ft); it gives its name to the Haft Khan ridge, which carries numerous summits above 4,000 metres (13,000 ft). The massif's highest summit is Alam-Kuh (4,850 metres (15,910 ft)), a major centre of Iranian mountaineering.

== See also ==
- List of Iranian four-thousanders
