= Zarin Kuh =

- Location within Iran

Highest point
- Elevation: 4,198 m (13,773 ft)
- Coordinates: 36.2786°N 51.0603°E

Naming
- Native name: زرین‌کوه (Persian)

Geography
- Location: Mazandaran Province, Iran
- Parent range: Takht-e Suleyman Massif of the central Alborz

Zarin Kuh (Persian: زرین‌کوه, also romanized Zarrin-Kuh or Zarrineh Kuh) is a mountain in the Takht-e Suleyman Massif of the central Alborz, in Mazandaran Province, Iran. It is one of the Iranian four-thousanders, rising to about 4,198 metres (13,773 ft) (13,704 ft according to PeakVisor). It lies in the Takht-e Suleyman massif and should not be confused with Mount Zarrin in Damavand County. The massif's highest summit is Alam-Kuh (4,850 metres (15,910 ft)), a major centre of Iranian mountaineering.

== See also ==
- List of Iranian four-thousanders
