= Koloon Bastak =

Mountain in the central Alborz, Iran

- Location within Iran

Highest point
- Elevation: 4,156 m (13,635 ft)
- Prominence: 352 m (1,155 ft)
- Coordinates: 36.0534°N 51.4655°E

Naming
- Native name: کلون بستک (Persian)

Geography
- Location: Tehran Province, Iran
- Parent range: Kholeno massif, central Alborz

Koloon Bastak (Persian: کلون بستک, also romanized Kolun Bastak) is a mountain in the central Alborz, in Tehran Province, Iran, at the meeting point of the Shemshak, Dizin and Gajareh districts. One of the Iranian four-thousanders, its elevation is reported as between about 4,156 metres (13,635 ft) and 4,180 metres (13,710 ft), and it has a topographic prominence of about 352 metres (1,155 ft).

== Geography ==
Koloon Bastak stands at the western end of the Kholeno (Sarakchal) ridge. The Karaj River, the main river of the region, rises in the Khorsang highlands at the foot of the mountain. The peak lies within the Central Alborz Protected Area.

== Name ==
According to a popular explanation reported by Iranian state media, the name combines kolun, an old word for the bolt or latch of a door, with bastak, "closed", a reference to a local legend of valleys "shut like a bolted door".

== Climbing ==
Because the Dizin road reaches about 3,300 metres (10,800 ft) near its foot, Koloon Bastak is one of the most accessible peaks over 4,000 metres (13,000 ft) near Tehran, and is often used as an acclimatisation climb for Damavand and Alam-Kuh. The standard route ascends the southern ridge from the Dizin pass in three to four hours; it is an easy ascent in summer but a serious one in winter. The recommended season is from late June to late September.

== See also ==
- List of Iranian four-thousanders
