= Varevasht =

Mountain in Iran

- Location within Iran

Highest point
- Elevation: 4,030 m (13,220 ft)
- Prominence: 872 m (2,861 ft)
- Coordinates: 36.2872°N 51.3543°E

Naming
- Native name: وروشت (Persian)

Geography
- Location: Mazandaran Province, Iran
- Parent range: central Alborz

Varevasht (Persian: وروشت, also romanized Varavašt or Veravasht; also known as Dehla) is a mountain in the central Alborz, in Mazandaran Province, Iran, on the Nur ridge that bounds the Kojur basin to the south. It is one of the Iranian four-thousanders. According to the Encyclopædia Iranica, Varavašt is the highest peak of the Kojur basin, with an elevation of 4,008 metres (13,150 ft); other sources give about 4,030 metres (13,220 ft), and it has a topographic prominence of about 872 metres (2,861 ft).

== See also ==
- List of Iranian four-thousanders
