= Mount Bahr Aseman =

Mountain in Iran

Coordinates: 29°09′N 57°20′E

Mount Bahr Aseman (Persian: کوه بحر آسمان, romanized: Kuh-e Bahr Aseman) is a mountain located approximately 15 kilometres south of the town of Sarduiyeh and about 60 kilometres east of the city of Baft in Kerman Province in southeast Iran. With an elevation of 3,886 metres, the mountain is among high peaks of Iran. Made chiefly of Eocene pyroclastic rocks, Mount Bahr Aseman is situated in a central Iranian range, Sahand-Bazman volcanic range or belt, a mountain range which was formed mainly during Eocene volcanism and that stretches approximately from Sahand Volcano in the north-west of Iran to Bazman Volcano in the south-east of Iran.
