= Mian-Seh-Chal =

Mountain in Alborz range, Iran

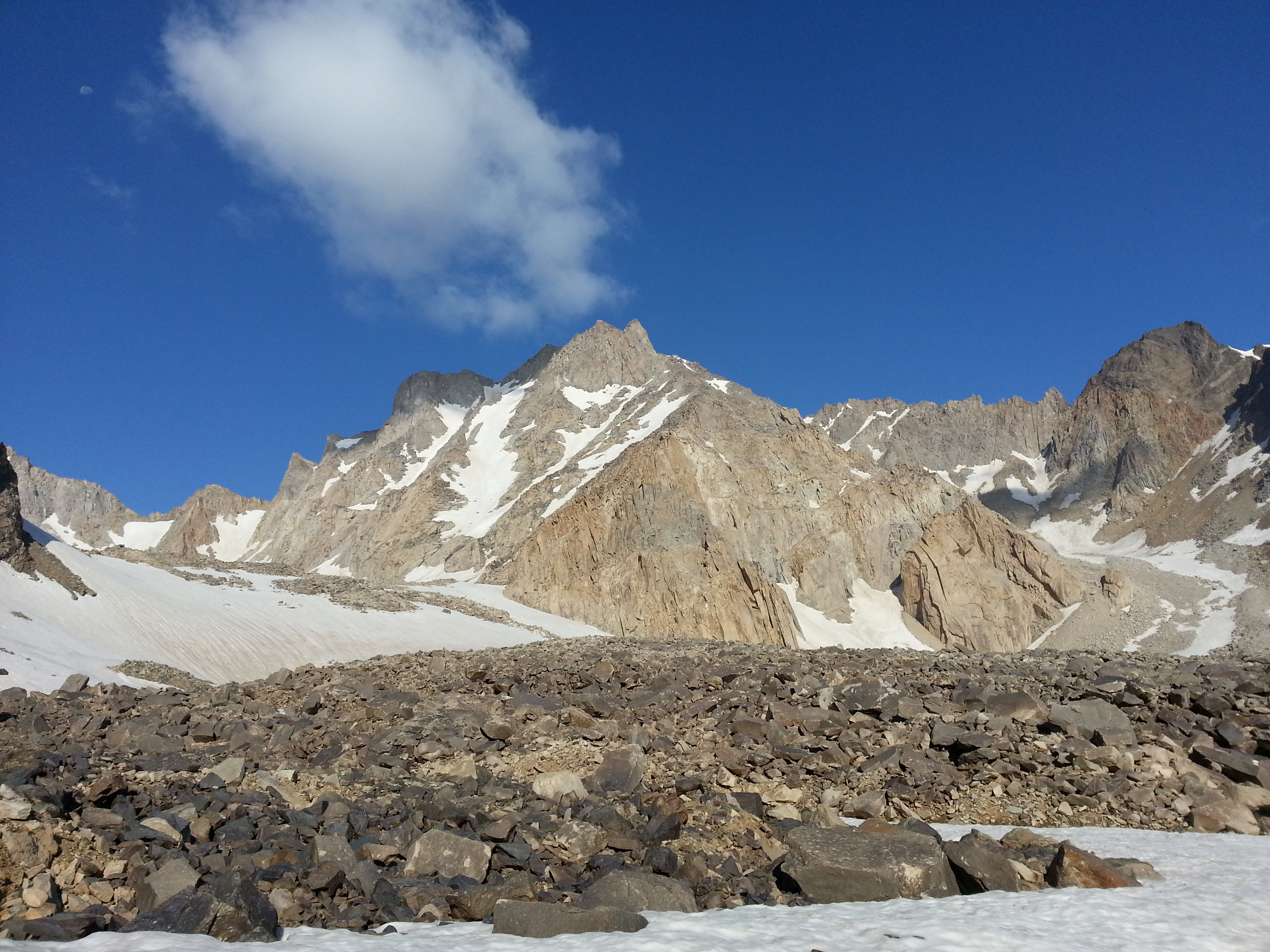
- Mian-Seh-Chal summit

Highest point
- Elevation: 4,348 m (14,265 ft)
- Coordinates: 36°23′11″N 50°58′27″E

Geography
- Location within Iran
- Location: Māzandarān, Iran
- Parent range: Alborz

Climbing
- Easiest route: Hike

Mian-Seh-Chal (Persian: میان سه چال, lit. 'Between Three Pits') is a mountain in the Takht-e Suleyman Massif, Alborz mountain range, north of Iran.

With an elevation of 4,348 metres (14,265 ft), it is located in the middle of North Eastern glacier of the massif, just as its name suggests.

== See also ==
- List of Iranian four-thousanders
