= Bel Mountain =

Highest mountain of Fars Province, Iran

- Location within Iran

Highest point
- Elevation: 3,943 m (12,936 ft)
- Prominence: 1,563 m (5,128 ft)
- Listing: Ultra
- Coordinates: 30.7775°N 52.7500°E

Naming
- Native name: کوه بل (Persian)

Geography
- Location: Eqlid County, Fars Province, Iran
- Parent range: Zagros

Bel Mountain (Persian: کوه بل, romanized: Kuh-e Bel) is a mountain in the Zagros of Eqlid County, Fars Province, Iran, about 14 kilometres (8.7 mi) south of the town of Eqlid. The highest summit of Fars Province, it is nicknamed the "Roof of Fars" (بام استان فارس). Iranian databases give its elevation as 3,943 metres (12,936 ft), while Persian-language sources commonly cite about 4,050 metres (13,290 ft).

== Geography ==
Bel is the dominant summit of the so-called White Mountain (کوهستان سفید) group in the southern Zagros. Several springs on its flanks feed the Harah river, and a mountain refuge stands at about 3,550 metres (11,650 ft) on the route to the summit. The separate Basiran no-hunting area lies a few kilometres east of Eqlid and is not part of the mountain itself.

== Name ==
The name Bel is generally explained as deriving from a Middle Persian (Pahlavi) word meaning "tall" or "high". Because it is the highest point in the province, it is widely known as the "Roof of Fars".

== Prominence and climbing ==
With a topographic prominence of about 1,563 metres (5,128 ft), Bel is an ultra-prominent peak. It is one of the provincial high points in the Iranian mountaineering federation's "Simorgh" project of summiting the highest peak of every province, which has made it a popular objective. The standard route climbs from the Lay-Shekaft valley south of Eqlid; the rocky, scree-covered summit is a non-technical but strenuous ascent with avalanche risk in winter. In August 2020, a 58-year-old climber died of cardiac arrest while ascending the mountain.

== See also ==
- List of Iranian four-thousanders
- Ultra-prominent peak
