= Siah-Kaman =

Mountain in Iran

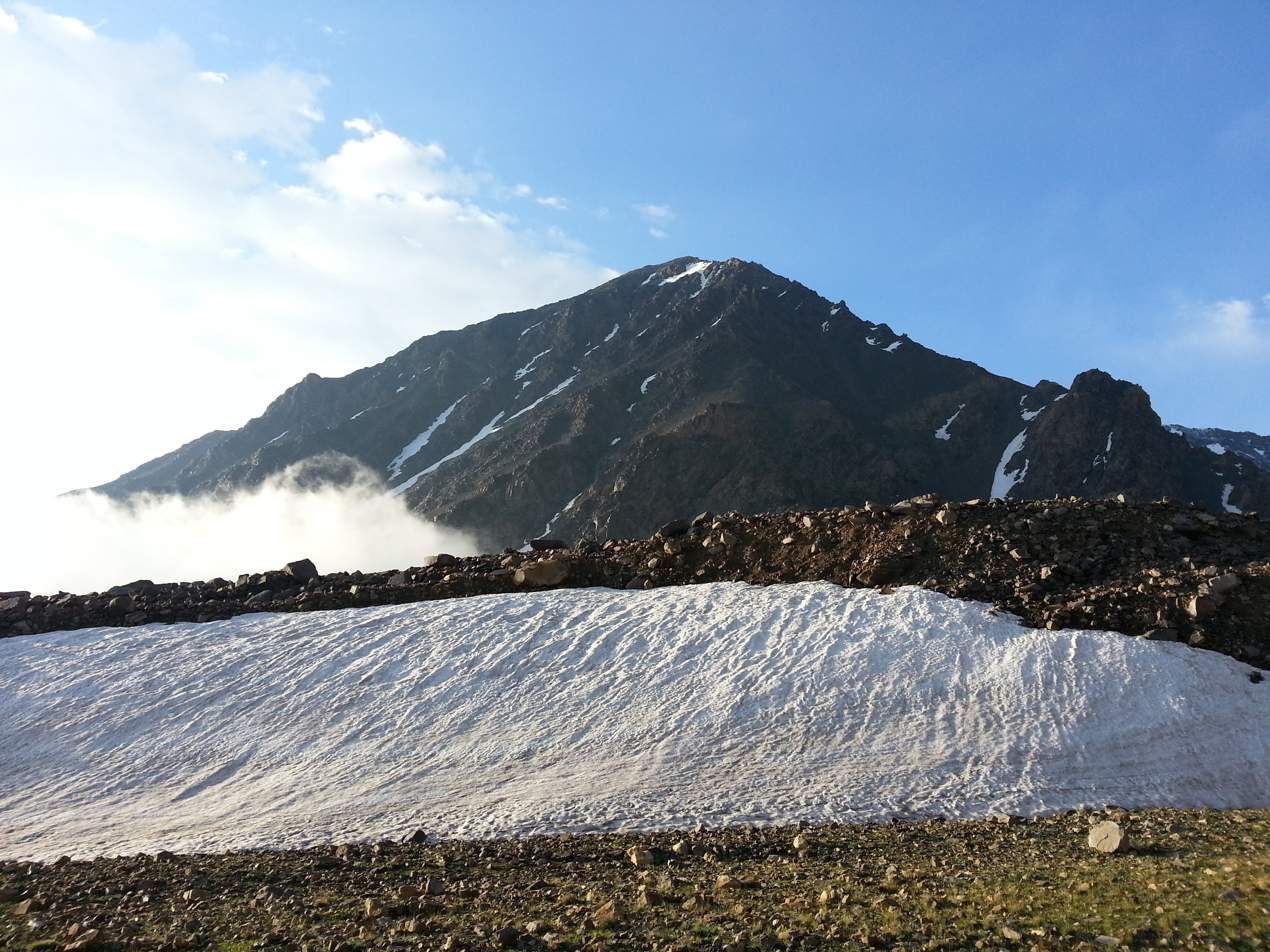
- Takht-e-Soleiman summit

Highest point
- Elevation: 4,472 m (14,672 ft)
- Coordinates: 36°23′30.4″N 50°59′27″E

Geography
- Location within Iran
- Location: Māzandarān, Iran
- Parent range: Alborz

Climbing
- Easiest route: Hike

Siah-Kaman (Persian: سیاه کمان, lit. 'Black Bow') is a mountain in the Takht-e Suleyman Massif, Alborz mountain range, in northern Iran. Its elevation is 4,472 metres (14,672 ft).

== Geographical location ==
Siah Kaman is located on the eastern side of Alamkoh peak and the northern flank of the Takht Suleiman mountain region, which is one of the highest regions of Central Alborz, featuring many peaks above 4,000 meters, from the north to Chalus to Tankabon, from the west to the Three Thousand Tankabon valley. It is limited to Taleqan and Alamut from the south and to the Chalus Valley from the east.

== See also ==
- List of Iranian four-thousanders
