= South Khersan =

- Location within Iran

Highest point
- Elevation: 4,659 m (15,285 ft)
- Coordinates: 36.3648°N 50.9522°E

Naming
- Native name: خرسان جنوبی (Persian)

Geography
- Location: Mazandaran Province, Iran
- Parent range: Takht-e Suleyman Massif of the central Alborz

South Khersan (Persian: خرسان جنوبی) is a mountain in the Takht-e Suleyman Massif of the central Alborz, in Mazandaran Province, Iran. Rising to 4,659 metres (15,285 ft), it is one of the Iranian four-thousanders and the southernmost named summit of the Khersan ridge. The massif's highest summit is Alam-Kuh (4,850 metres (15,910 ft)), a major centre of Iranian mountaineering.

== See also ==
- List of Iranian four-thousanders
