= Shah Neshin (mountain) =

Mountain in Iran

- Location within Iran

Highest point
- Elevation: 3,875 m (12,713 ft)
- Prominence: 173 m (568 ft)
- Coordinates: 35.8889°N 51.3800°E

Naming
- Native name: شاه‌نشین (Persian)

Geography
- Location: Tehran Province, Iran
- Parent range: Tochal ridge, central Alborz

Shah Neshin (Persian: شاه‌نشین) is a mountain on the Tochal ridge of the central Alborz, west of the summit of Tochal, in Tehran Province, Iran. It rises to about 3,875 metres (12,713 ft) and has a topographic prominence of about 173 metres (568 ft). Persian-language climbing guides place it along the main Tochal ridge north-west of Tehran and give its height as about 3,885 metres (12,746 ft).
