= Dena =

Sub-range within the Zagros Mountains in Iran

Mount Dena
- دنا
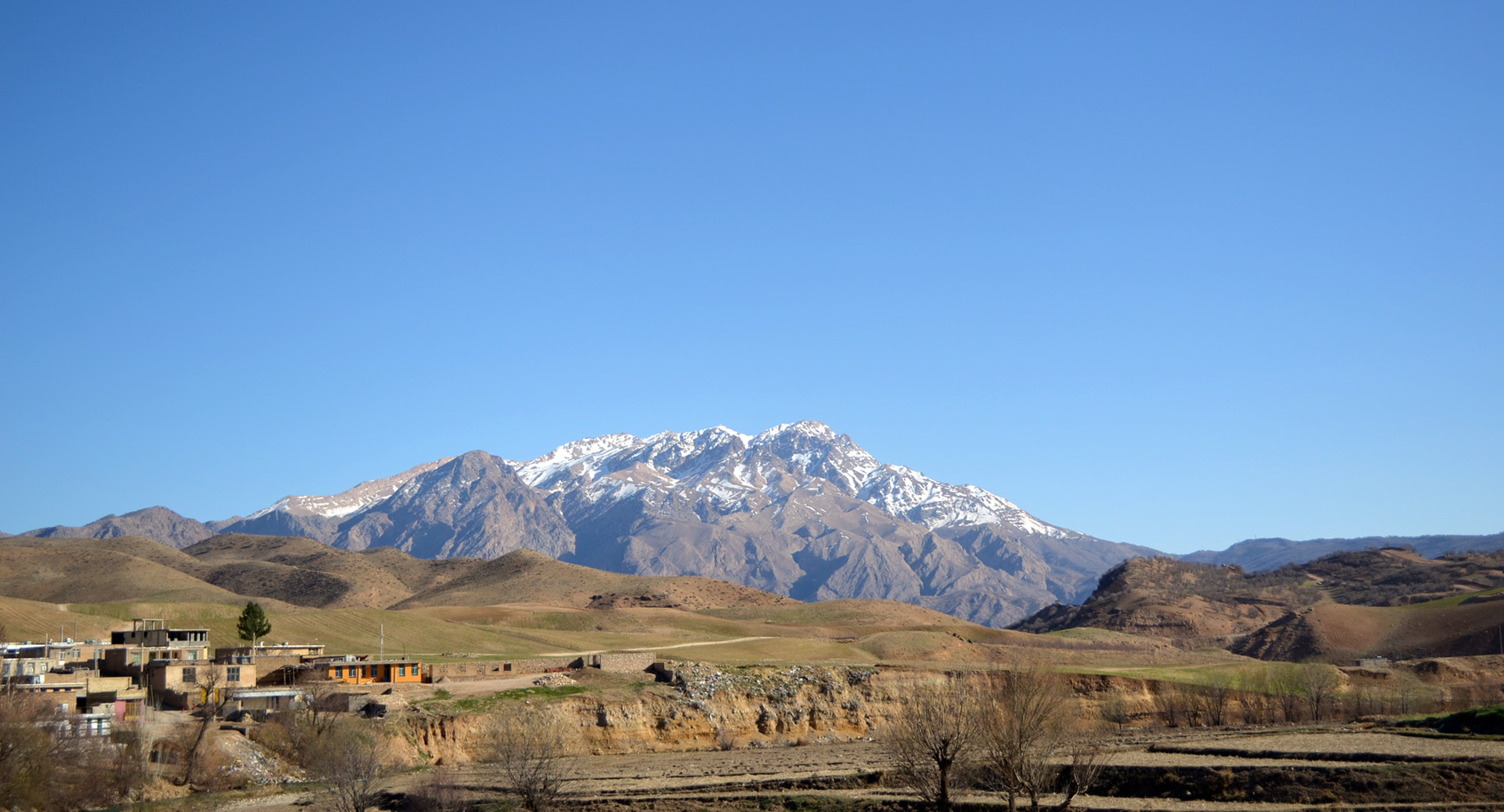
- A view of Mount Dena from the north, from the road between Yasuj and Semirom

Highest point
- Peak: Qash-Mastan
- Elevation: 4,409 m (14,465 ft)
- Prominence: 2,604 m (8,543 ft)
- Coordinates: 30°57′N 51°26′E

Dimensions
- Length: 80 km (50 mi)
- Width: 15 km (9.3 mi)

Naming
- Language of name: Persian and Luri

Geography
- Location within Iran Location within Asia

Topography of Iran

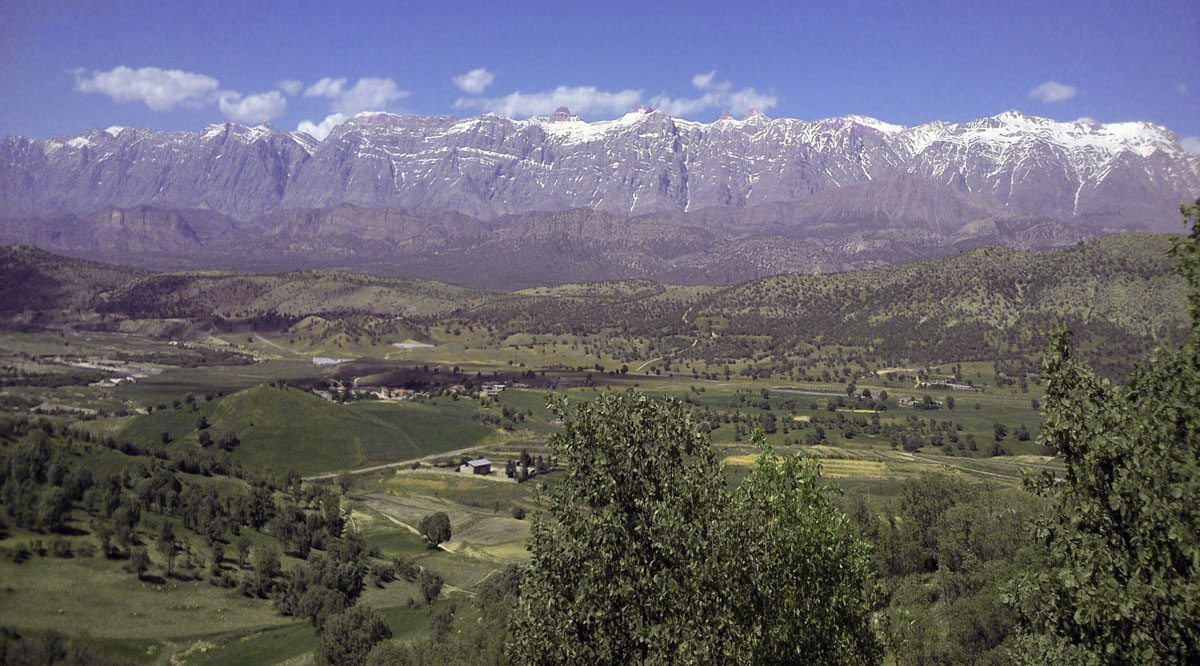
Dena Range as seen from South West

Dena (in Luri and Persian: دنا) is the name of a sub-range within the Zagros Mountains, Iran. Mount Dena, with 80 km (50 miles) length and 15 km (9.3 miles) average width, is situated on the boundary of the Isfahan, Kohgiluyeh and Boyer-Ahmad and Chaharmahal and Bakhtiari Provinces of Iran.

Mount Dena has more than 40 peaks higher than 4,000 metres (13,000 feet). Annual precipitation in Mount Dena ranges from 600 to 1,800 mm (24 to 71 in).

Geologically, Mount Dena is located in the Sanandaj-Sirjan geologic and structural zone of Iran and is mainly made of Cretaceous limestone.

== Iran Aseman Airlines Flight 3704 Accident ==
On 18 February 2018, Iran Aseman Airlines Flight 3704, operating a scheduled domestic passenger flight, crashed into Mount Dena while en route from Tehran to Yasuj. The aircraft, an ATR 72-212, was carrying 60 passengers and 6 crew members; all on board perished in the accident. The crash occurred in foggy and mountainous terrain, posing challenges for rescue teams.

The incident drew significant media attention and prompted discussions about aviation safety in Iran. Recovery efforts were hampered by severe weather conditions and the remote location of the crash site on the slopes of Mount Dena.

== Gallery ==
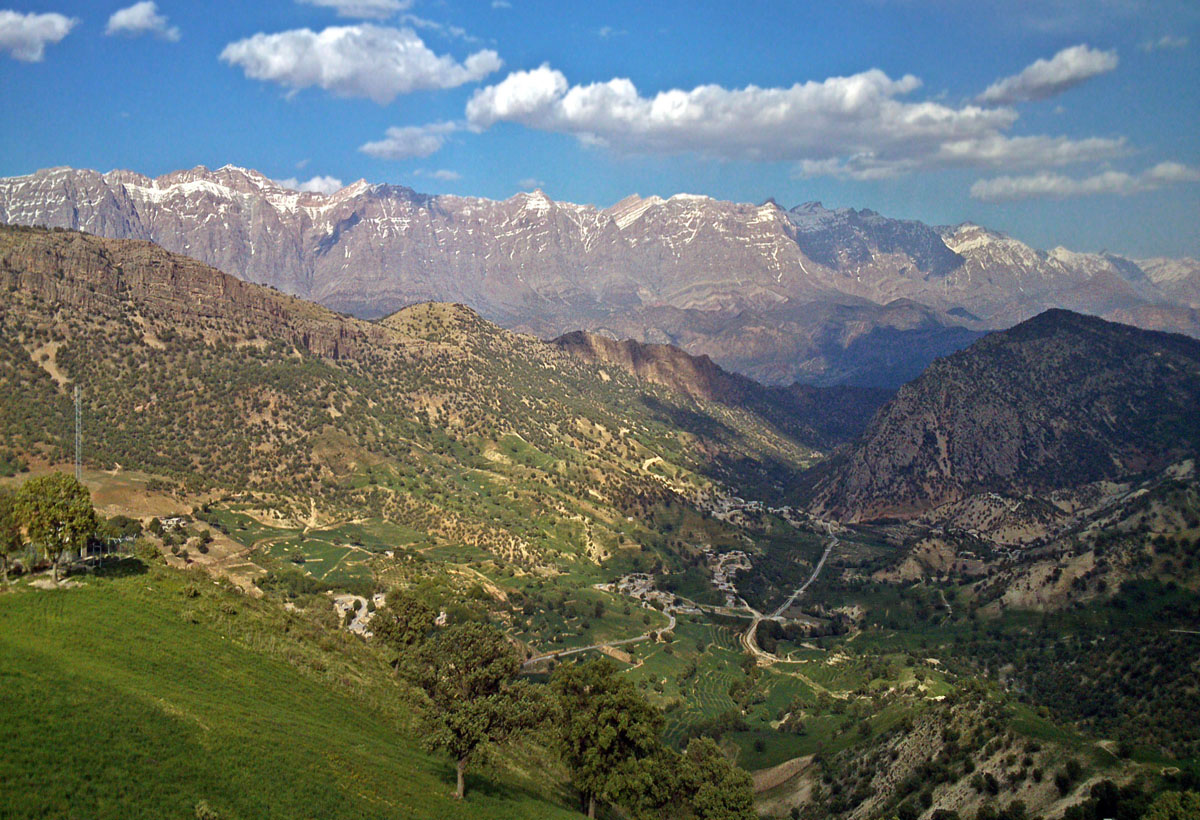

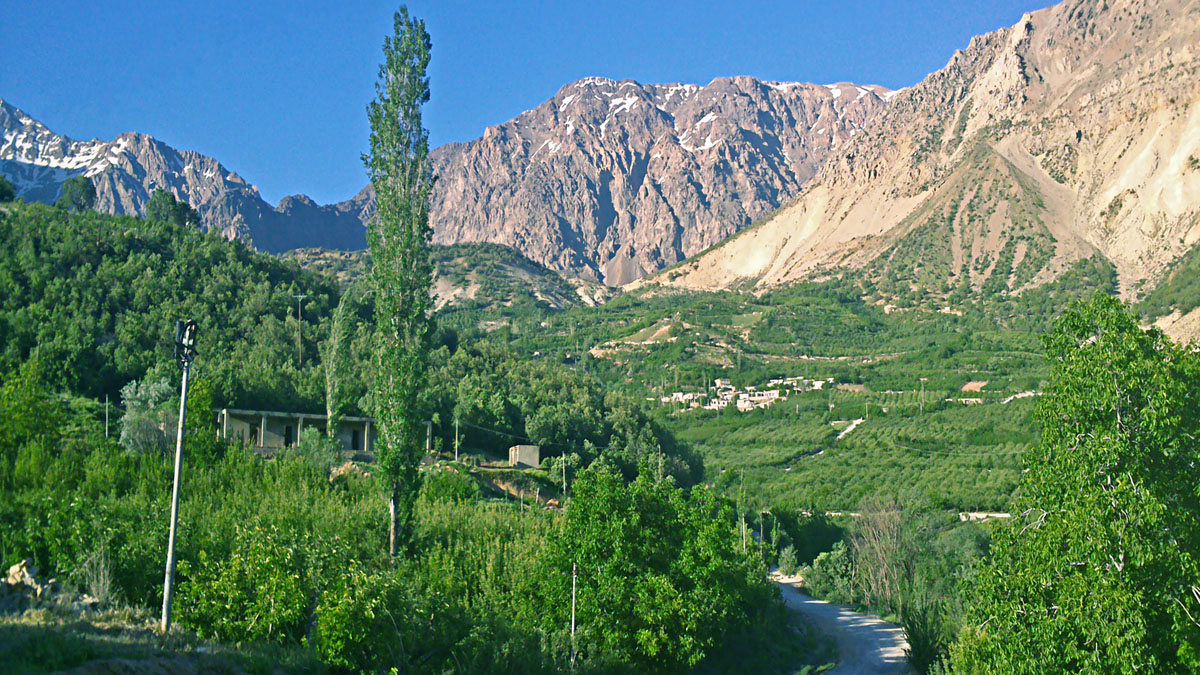

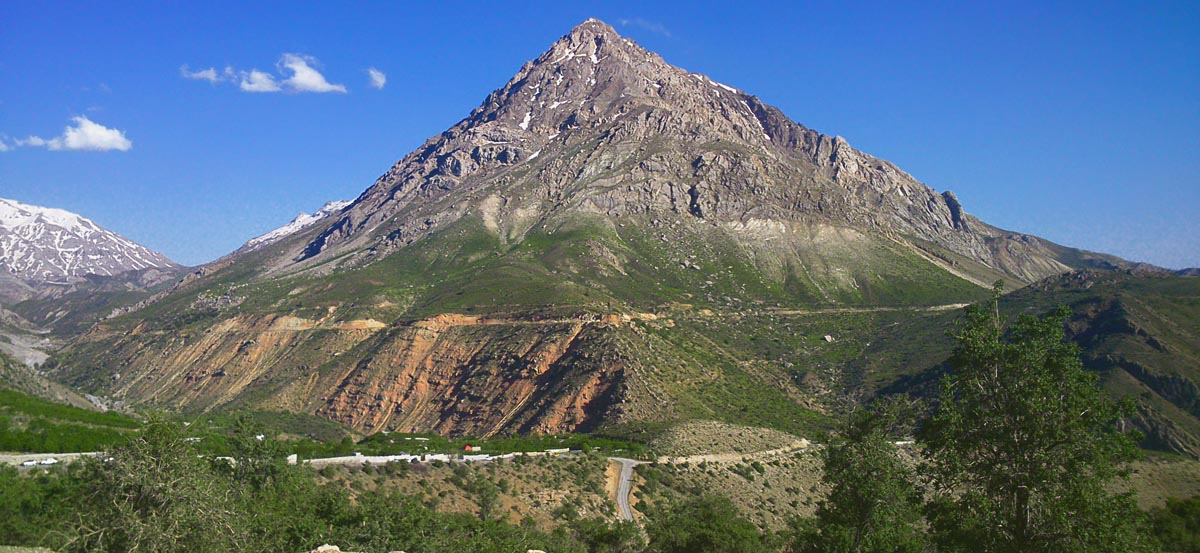

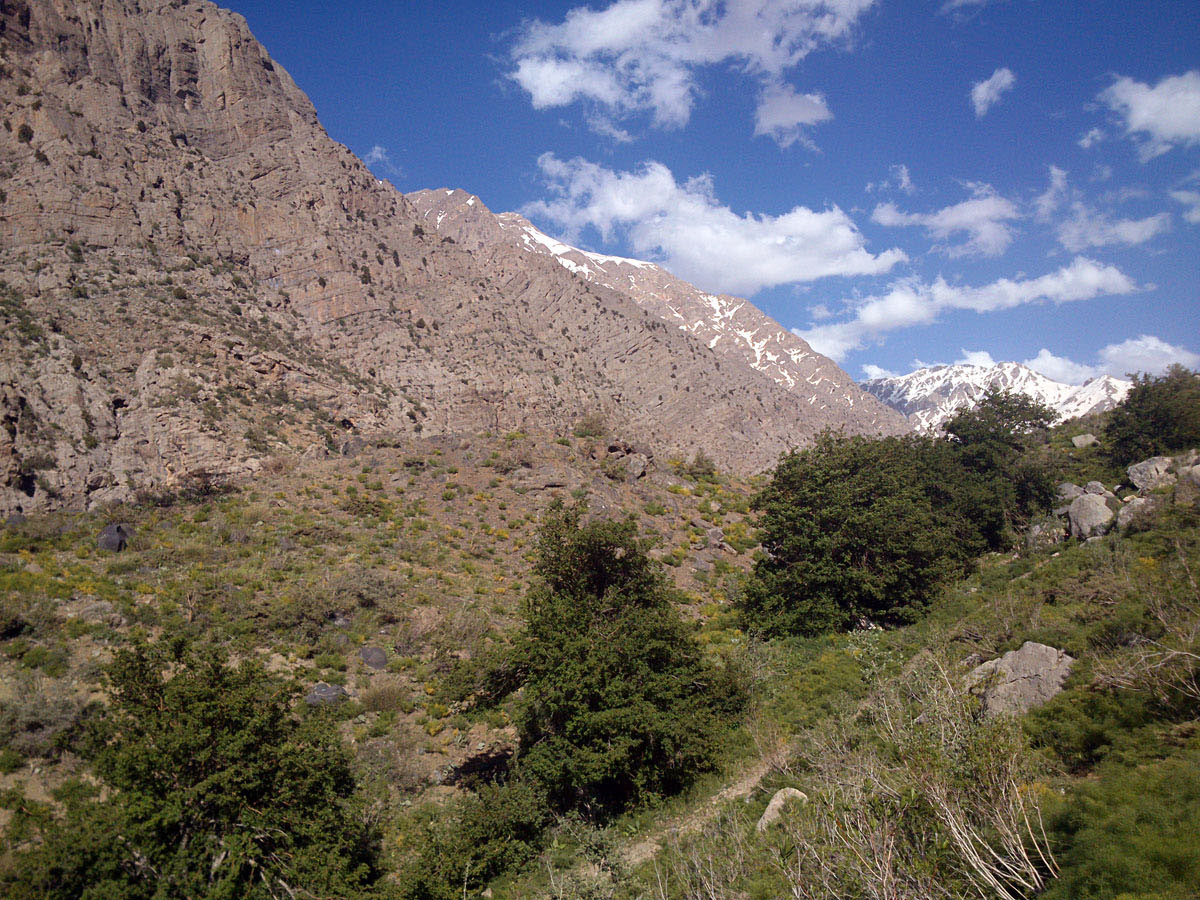

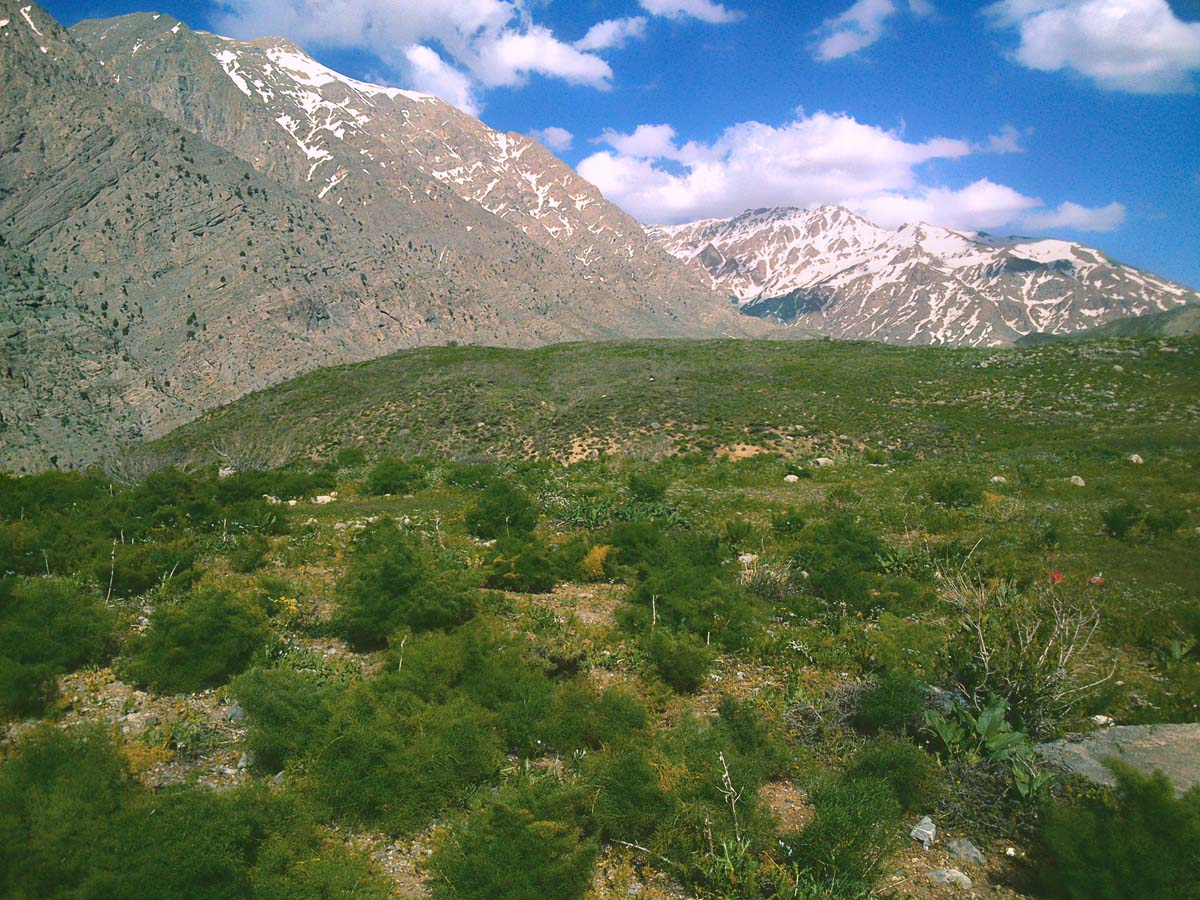

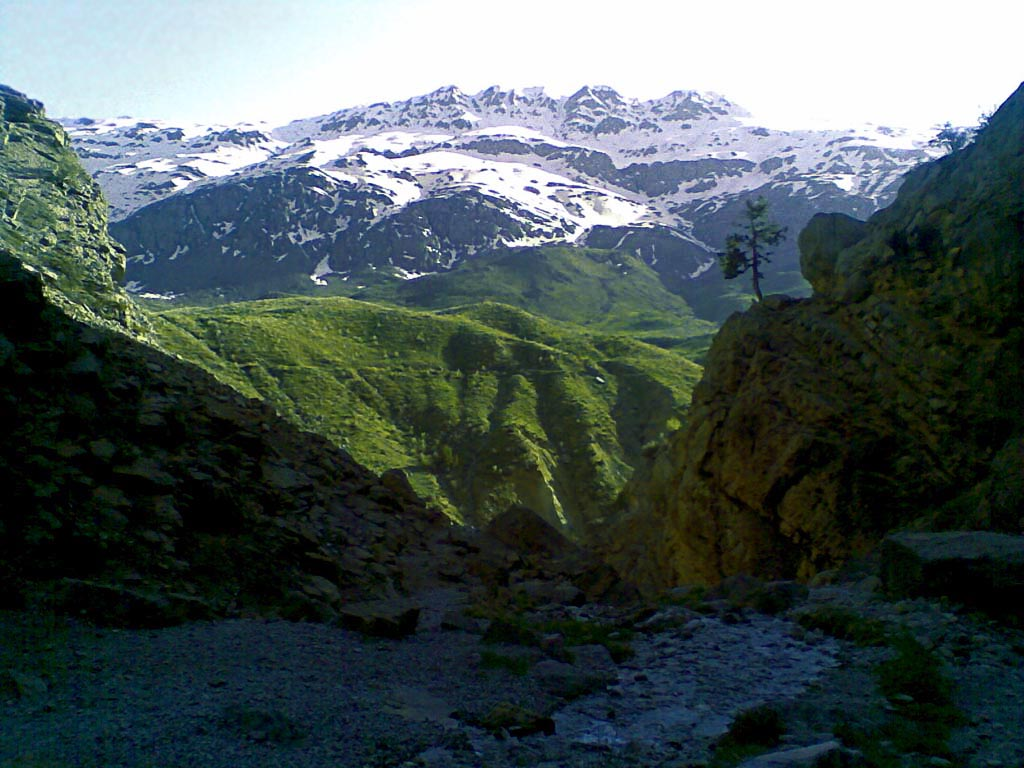

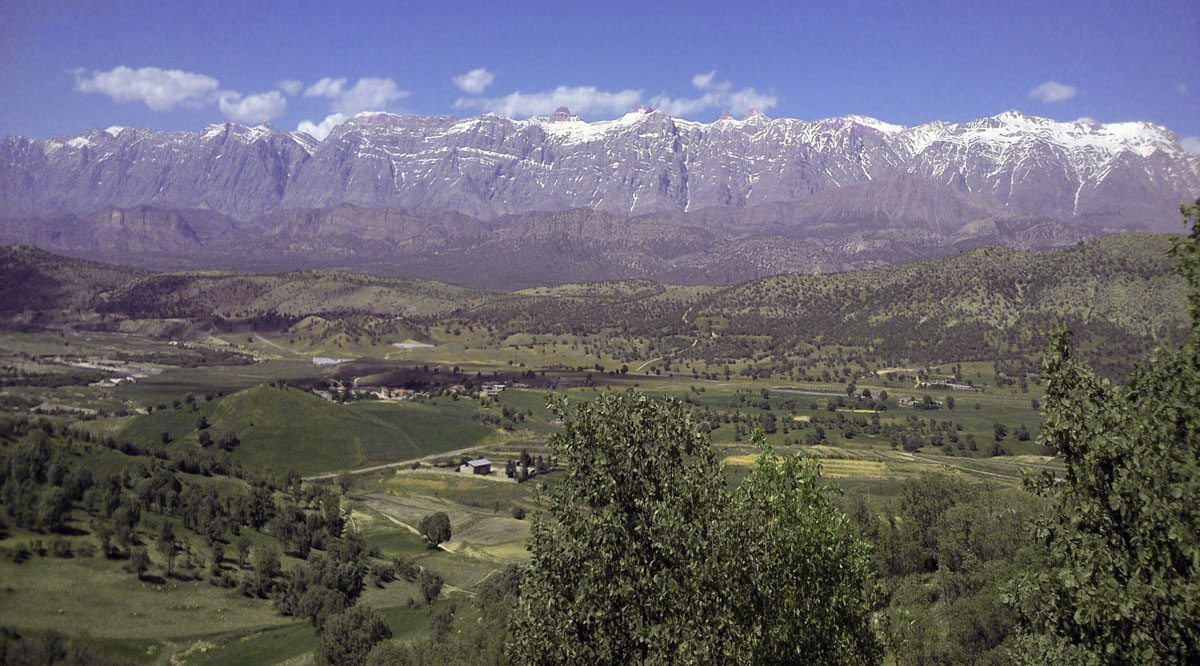

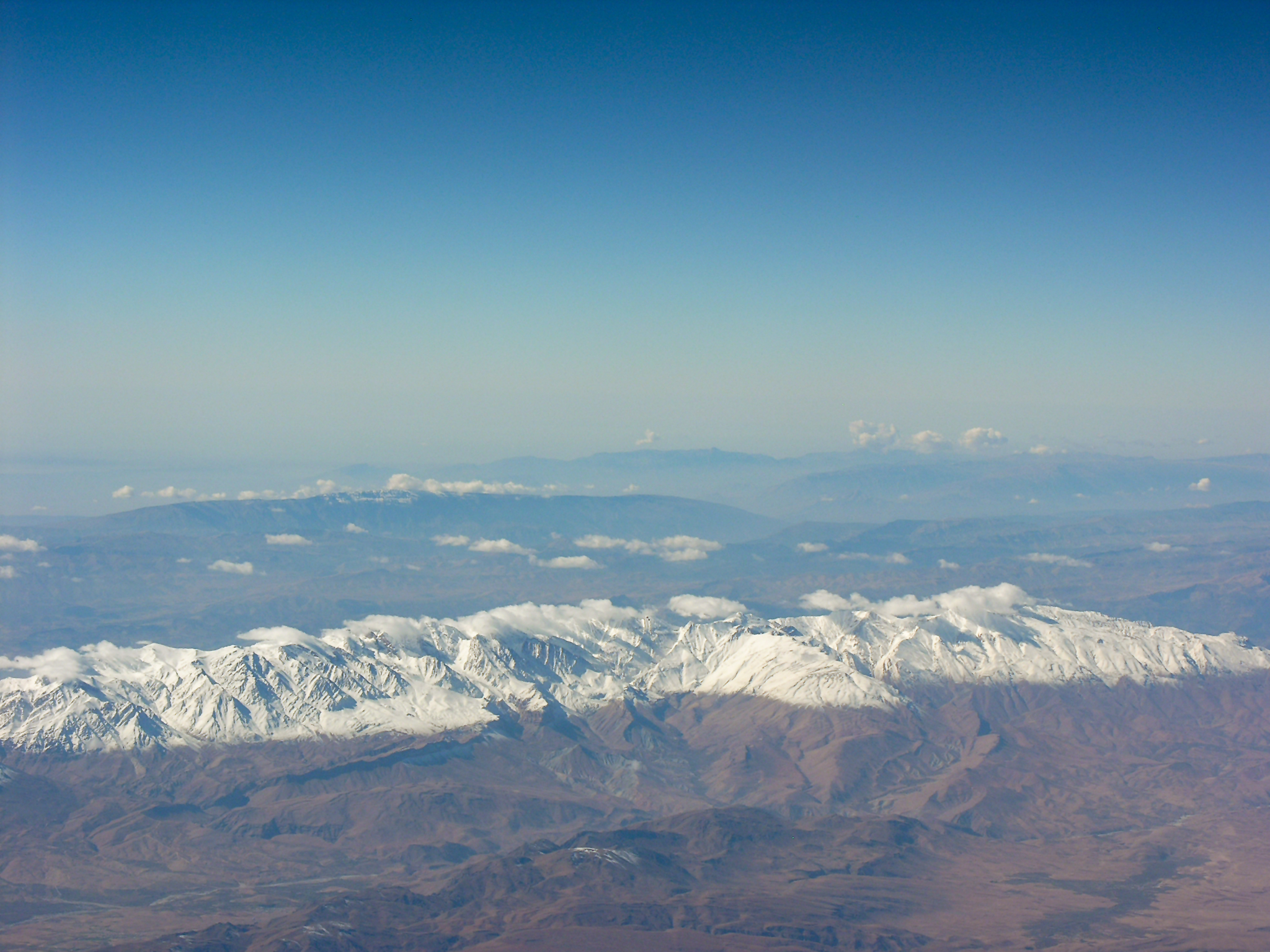

== See also ==
- List of Iranian four-thousanders
- List of ultras of West Asia
