= Sataple =

Mountain in Isfahan Province, Iran

- Setableh
- Location within Iran

Highest point
- Elevation: 3,775 m (12,385 ft)
- Coordinates: 33.0031°N 50.0253°E

Naming
- Native name: ستبله (Persian)

Geography
- Location: Buin Miandasht County / Fereydunshahr County, Isfahan Province, Iran
- Parent range: Zagros

Sataple or Setableh (Persian: ستبله; also rendered ساتاپله, Satapla) is a mountain in the Zagros range of western Isfahan Province, Iran. Lying near the town of Afus, between Buin Miandasht County and Fereydunshahr County, it reaches an elevation of about 3,775 metres (12,385 ft). The mountain gives its name to the surrounding Setableh protected hunting-prohibited area, and the Afus ski resort lies on its slopes.

== Name ==
The name is of Georgian origin, a legacy of the Georgian community of Fereydan who were settled in the Fereydan region—including the town of Afus—in the early 17th century. In the local Georgian micro-toponymy studied by the linguist Giorgi Muliani, the name derives from Georgian სათაფლე (sa-tapl-e), meaning "a place where honey is found", from თაფლი (tapli, "honey"). It is rendered in Persian as ستبله (Setableh) and ساتاپله (Satapla).

== Geography ==
Sataple stands in the high Zagros of western Isfahan Province, on the boundary between Buin Miandasht and Fereydunshahr counties, close to the Georgian-founded town of Afus. The geographical database GeoNames records the summit at 33.0031°N 50.0253°E with an elevation of 3,775 metres (12,385 ft).

== Setableh protected area ==
The mountain lies within, and lends its name to, the Setableh hunting-prohibited area (Persian: منطقه شکارممنوع ستبله), one of the protected no-hunting areas administered by the Department of Environment in Isfahan Province. The area straddles Buin Miandasht and Fereydunshahr counties and is patrolled by environmental rangers; in one widely reported incident a ranger was shot and wounded by a poacher within the Setableh area. Its wildlife includes species such as the stone marten, individuals of which have been released there by conservation officers.

== Afus ski resort ==
The Afus ski resort (Persian: پیست اسکی افوس) lies on the slopes of the mountain near the town of Afus, in the Sarcheshmeh recreation area. With a piste about 850 metres (2,790 ft) to 860 metres (2,820 ft) long, it is one of the highest-altitude ski runs in Iran and the second professionally developed ski piste in Isfahan Province. It was built and opened by the Afus municipality in the winter of 2013–14, and is served by a button (plate) lift that carries skiers up the mountainside.

== See also ==
- Georgians in Iran
- Fereydan
- Fereydunshahr (ski resort)
