= Mehrchal =

Mountain in the central Alborz, Iran

- Location within Iran

Highest point
- Elevation: 3,912 m (12,835 ft)
- Prominence: 785 m (2,575 ft)
- Coordinates: 35.9284°N 51.6429°E

Naming
- Native name: مهرچال (Persian)

Geography
- Location: Tehran Province, Iran
- Parent range: central Alborz

Mehrchal (Persian: مهرچال) is a mountain in the central Alborz, in Tehran Province, Iran, north of the village of Emameh between the Lar plain and the mountains of Lavasanat. Its elevation is given as between about 3,903 metres (12,805 ft) and 3,921 metres (12,864 ft) by different sources, with 3,912 metres (12,835 ft) the most commonly cited figure, and it has a topographic prominence of about 785 metres (2,575 ft).

== Geography ==
Mehrchal forms part of a horseshoe-shaped ridge together with the neighbouring peaks Pirzankoloom (پیرزن‌کلوم, about 3,843 metres (12,608 ft)) and Hamhan (همهن); the three summits enclose a small upland plain, the Dasht-e Mehrchal, which has a stream and is used as a camp site. The mountain is usually approached from Emameh to the south or Garmabdar to the north. Its northern flank adjoins the Dasht-e Lar, within the Lar Protected Area, part of the wider Central Alborz Protected Area.

== Name ==
The name Mehrchal is generally understood as an ancient name meaning "place of the worship of Mithra" (the sun), and is linked to the remains of an old fire temple on the mountain associated with Mithra-worship and Zoroastrianism; the neighbouring peak Atashkuh ("fire mountain") echoes the same theme.

== Climbing ==
Mehrchal is considered a difficult and relatively little-visited summit of the central Alborz because of its long approaches and intricate route-finding. Four main routes are described: the south route from Emameh by way of the Dasht-e Mehrchal, the north ridge from Garmabdar, a western ridge by way of Espidchal and Hamhan, and a south-western ridge from Rahat-Abad. The Emameh route involves about 17 kilometres (11 mi) round trip and 1,672 metres (5,486 ft) of ascent; the best season is early summer, while winter brings severe wind, deep snow and avalanche risk.
