= Mount Do Baradaran =

Mountain in Iran

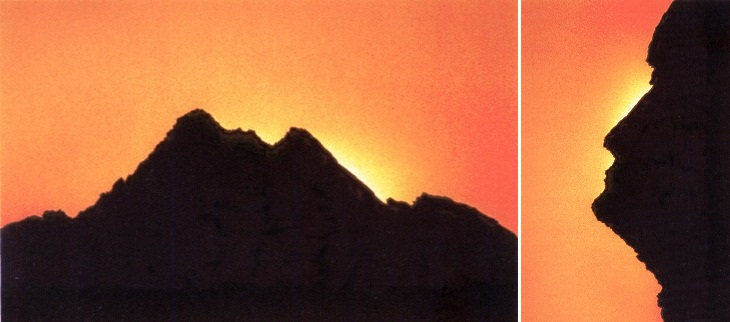
- The twin summits of Mount Do Baradaran

Highest point
- Elevation: 1,235 m (4,052 ft)
- Coordinates: 34.5756°N 50.8812°E

Naming
- Native name: کوه دوبرادران (Persian)

Geography
- Location within Iran
- Location: Qom Province, Iran
- Parent range: Central Iran

Mount Do Baradaran (Persian: کوه دوبرادران, lit. 'Two Brothers Mountain') is a mountain in Qom Province, Iran, on the south-eastern edge of the city of Qom, between the Jamkaran district and the neighbouring Mount Khidr (Kuh-e Khidr). It is formed of twin peaks of nearly equal height and is one of the natural features of Qom that have been entered on Iran's national list of natural heritage.

== Name ==
The name "Two Brothers" (دوبرادران, Do Baradaran) refers to the mountain's two adjacent summits, which are of similar size and shape; the eastern summit is slightly the higher of the two.

== Geography ==
Mount Do Baradaran lies to the south-east of the city of Qom, close to the Jamkaran Mosque and adjoining Mount Khidr. The geographical database GeoNames records the peak at 34.5756°N 50.8812°E with an elevation of 1,235 metres (4,052 ft). Persian-language sources, drawing on OpenStreetMap data, give a somewhat lower figure of about 1,160 metres (3,810 ft). The mountain has an east–west trending summit ridge created by its two joined peaks.

== Geology ==
Iranian sources describe the mountain as a north-eastern continuation of the Zagros ranges, although Qom itself lies within the Central Iranian and Urmia–Dokhtar transitional zone. Surveys have reported numerous fossil deposits of Tertiary age on and around Mount Do Baradaran, the sediments of an ancient sea, which give the area paleontological significance; for this reason its protection, including a proposed geopark, has been advocated.

== Conservation ==
Mount Do Baradaran was registered on Iran's national natural-heritage list together with a number of other natural features of Qom Province, among them the Qom salt dome and several ancient trees.

== Mountaineering ==
In spite of its modest height, the mountain is considered technically demanding to climb, with steep and locally overhanging rock faces. Its southern face in particular is regarded as dangerous and has been the scene of climbing accidents, so ascents are treated as technical mountaineering requiring ropes and equipment.
