= Tsikhe mountain =

Black basalt hill in Lake Hamun, Sistan and Baluchestan province, Iran

Tsikhe mount
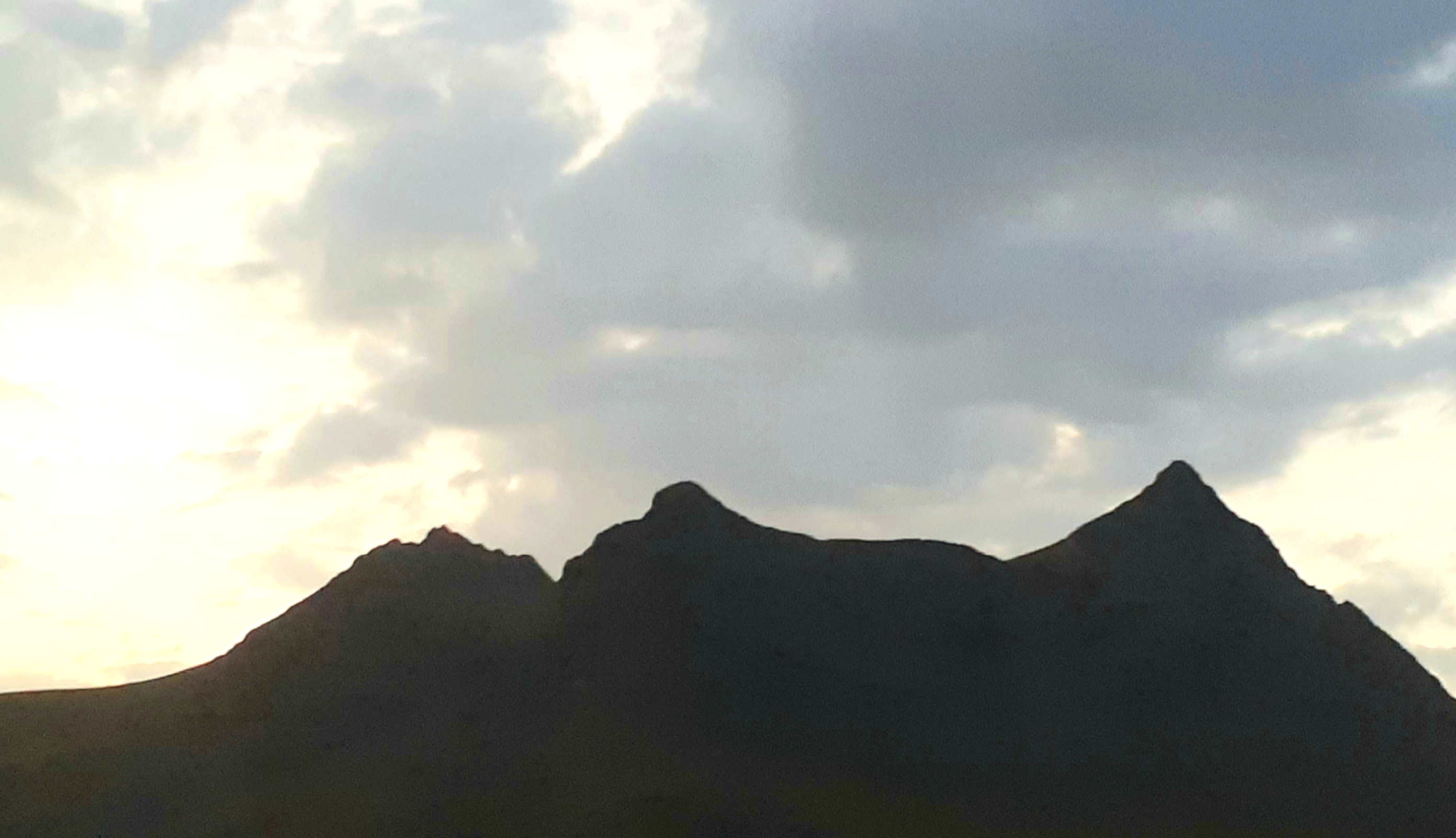

Highest point
- Elevation: 3,800 m (12,500 ft)

Geography
- Location: Iran, Isfahan, Fereydounshahr

Geology
- Mountain type: Hill

Tsikhe (Georgian: ციხე; Persian: تسیخه) is a mountain in Fereydunshahr county in Isfahan Province, Iran. Mount Tsikhe was the refuge of the people of Fereydunshahr when Karim Khan Zand (1705–1779) attacked Fereydunshahr.
