= Sabalan =

Mountain peak in northwestern Iran

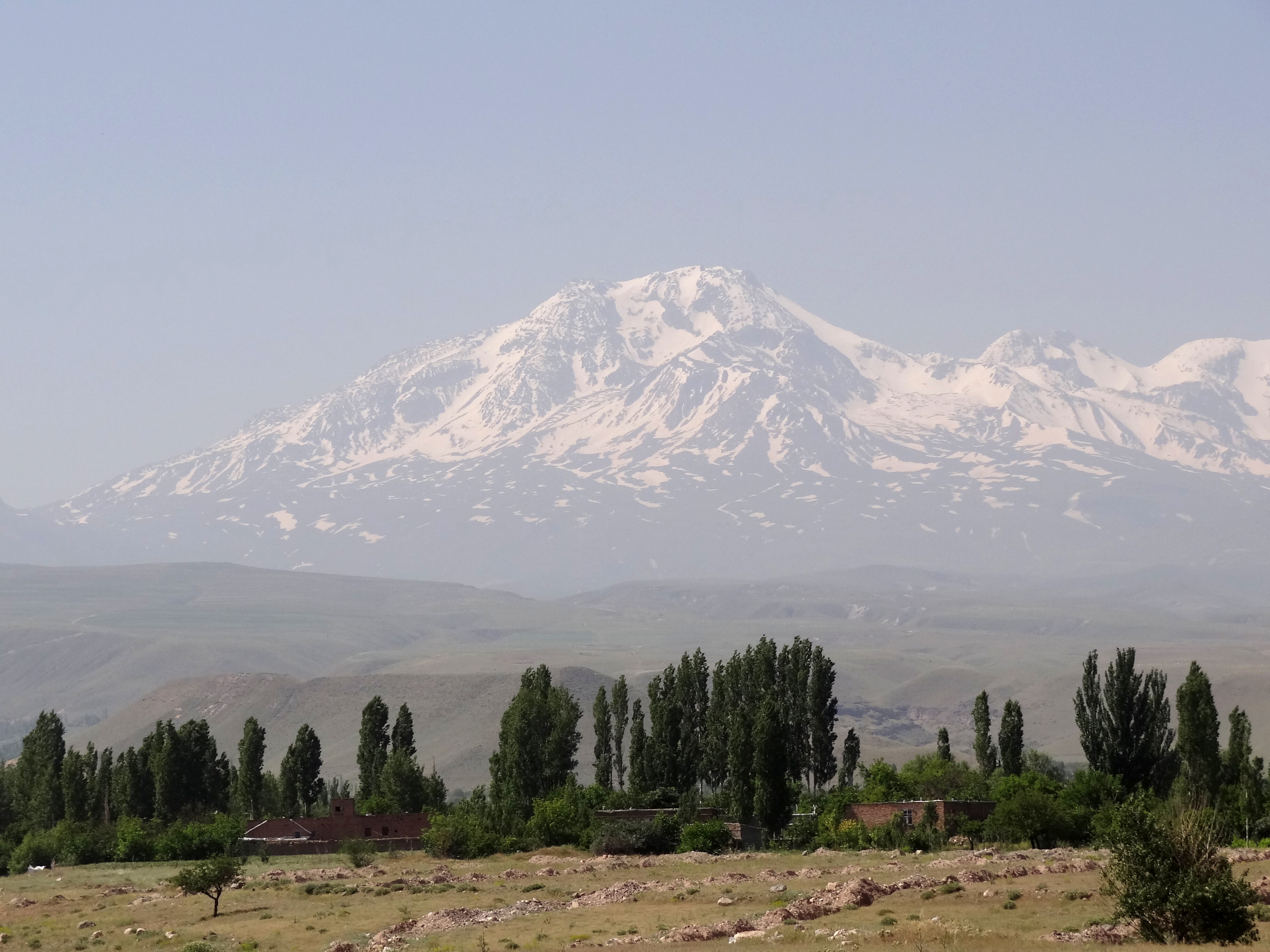
- Mount Sabalan

Highest point
- Elevation: 4,811 m (15,784 ft)
- Prominence: 3,283 m (10,771 ft); Ranked 66th
- Listing: Ultra
- Coordinates: 38°16′01″N 47°50′13″E

Geography
- Location within Iran
- Location: Meshkinshahr, Iran.

Geology
- Rock age: 5.6–1.4 million years
- Mountain type: Stratovolcano
- Last eruption: Unknown, possibly Holocene.

Climbing
- Easiest route: hiking / scrambling

Sabalan (Persian: سبلان) or Savalan (local Azerbaijani: ساوالان [sævæ'lɒːn]) is an inactive stratovolcano in northwestern Iran located in Ardabil province.

At 4,811 metres (15,784 ft) above sea level, it is the third-highest mountain in Iran. A permanent crater lake has formed at its summit. On one of its slopes around 3,600 metres (11,800 ft) there are large rock formations of eroded volcanic outcrops that resemble animals, birds, and insects.

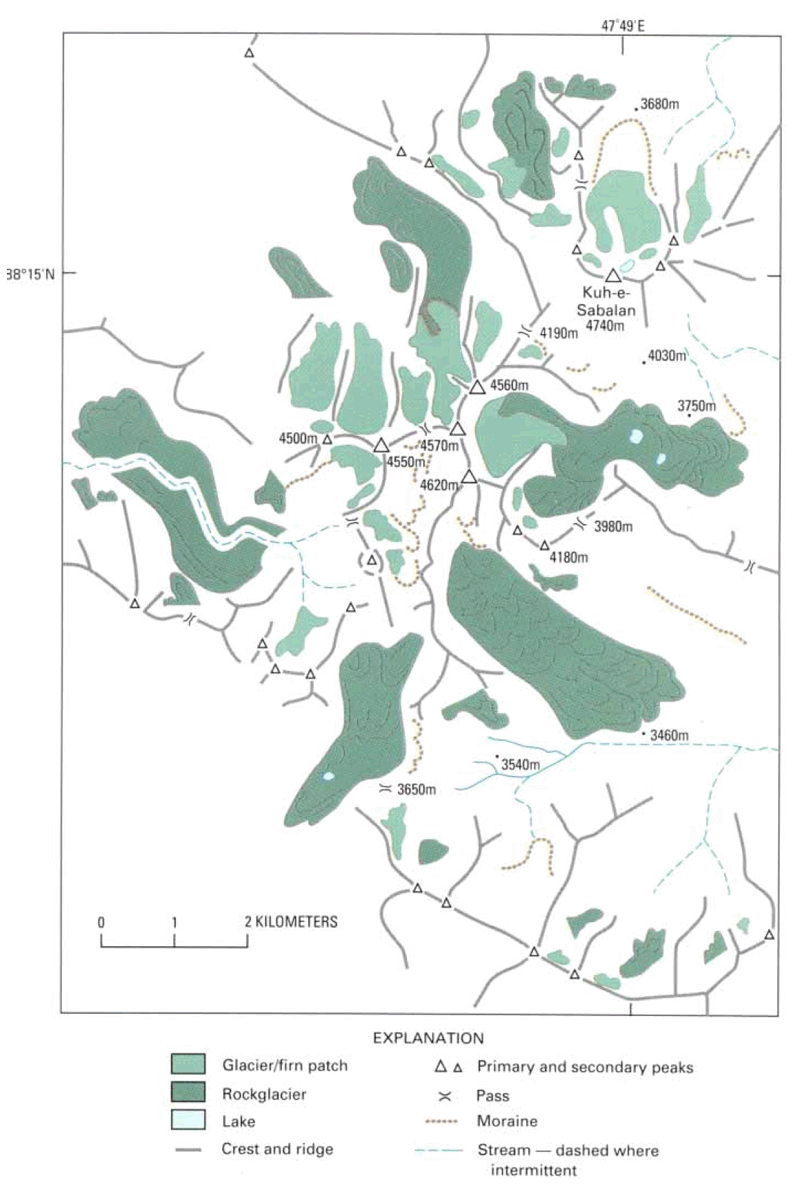
Map of summit region and glaciers of Sabalan.

== Mount Sabalan ==
Located in the extreme northwest of Iran, Sabalan is the country's third-highest peak after Damavand and Alam-Kuh. It is also slightly higher than Mont Blanc in the Alps.

The mountain has a number of attractions. On the slopes of the mountain, the mineral water from springs attracts tourists each year, some of whom have faith in healing properties attributed to the springs. The nomadic people of the area live in small villages, with their round "Yurt" tents appealing to tourists. Sabalan has a ski resort (Alvares) and different tourist areas such as the Sarein spa. The mountain is known for its views, including the Shirvan gorge, where few climbers venture.

== Geology ==
Sabalan is a large andesite stratovolcano in Meshgin Shahr, in Ardabil province in Iran. It is the second-highest volcano after Mount Damavand. The volcano is quite old. Its first eruptions occurred in the Eocene and later in the Miocene. But the main volcanism happened in the Pliocene and the Pleistocene as some of its rocks have been dated to 5–1.4 million years. Some references state that volcanic activity continued into the Holocene, less than 10,000 years ago.

The summit region has several peaks exceeding 4,500 metres (14,800 ft), primarily along a southwest–northeast trending ridge. The highest point 4,791 metres (15,719 ft) is at the northeast end of the ridge and is separated from the 4,620 metres (15,160 ft)+ group of southwestern summits by a 4,190 m (13,750 ft) col.

The mountain is located in a continental climate with hot, dry summers and extremely cold, snowy winters. Precipitation falls primarily as snow in late autumn, winter, and spring, and is sufficient to sustain seven glaciers near the summit above 4,000 metres (13,000 ft). The largest of these were more than 1.5 kilometres (1 mi) in length as of the 1970s. There are also extensive rock glaciers, several of which are more than 3 km (2 mi) in length.

== Climbing ==
The climbing surface includes rocks of various size (Class 2 scrambling), and a moderate degree of fitness is required to climb it. The climb from the base camp starts easy, becomes challenging midway, then eases in gradient near the top. The lake on the top remains frozen except for about four weeks in late July to early August.

Some climbers start by driving to hot springs of Meshgin Shahr, where they start their climb. This climb takes about two days, reaching the base camp on the first day. Others take a taxi to base camp early in the morning and climb the mountain in one day. In 2006, there was talk of improving the road to the base camp. If this is done, a regular car should be able to make it to the base camp during the climbing season. The road goes through multiple nomadic encampments of shepherds.

One or two days of acclimatization in Tehran or Ardabil may be advisable. Mountaineering has been popular among the youth in Iran. On a Friday during the climbing season (late June to mid-August), one may find hundreds of people on the mountain. Guides can also be found in Ardabil. Adequate climbing equipment can be purchased in Ardabil or Tehran.

== Surrounding area ==
The area around Sabalan, particularly near Meshkin, Sarab city and Ardabil city, produces large quantities of grain, including wheat. Due to the microclimate produced by the mountain, Ardabil remains pleasantly cool in the summers.

There are numerous hot springs around the slopes of Sabalan, with the main concentration within Sareyn County.

There are skiing slopes, with snow even in near-summer. A ski resort named "Alvares" is within an hour's drive from Sareyn on the south ridge of Sabalan.

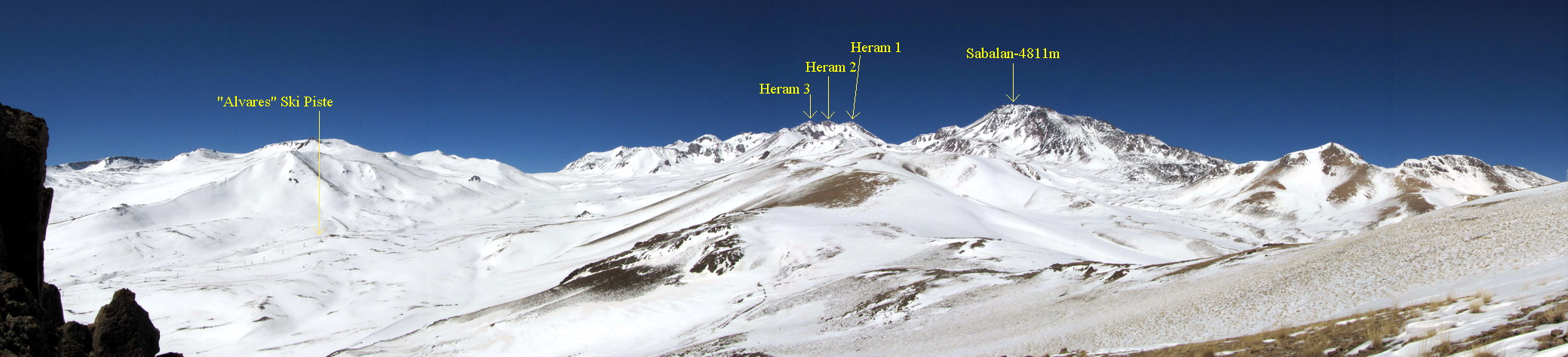
Mount Sabalan and Alvares ski piste seen from South

== Gallery ==
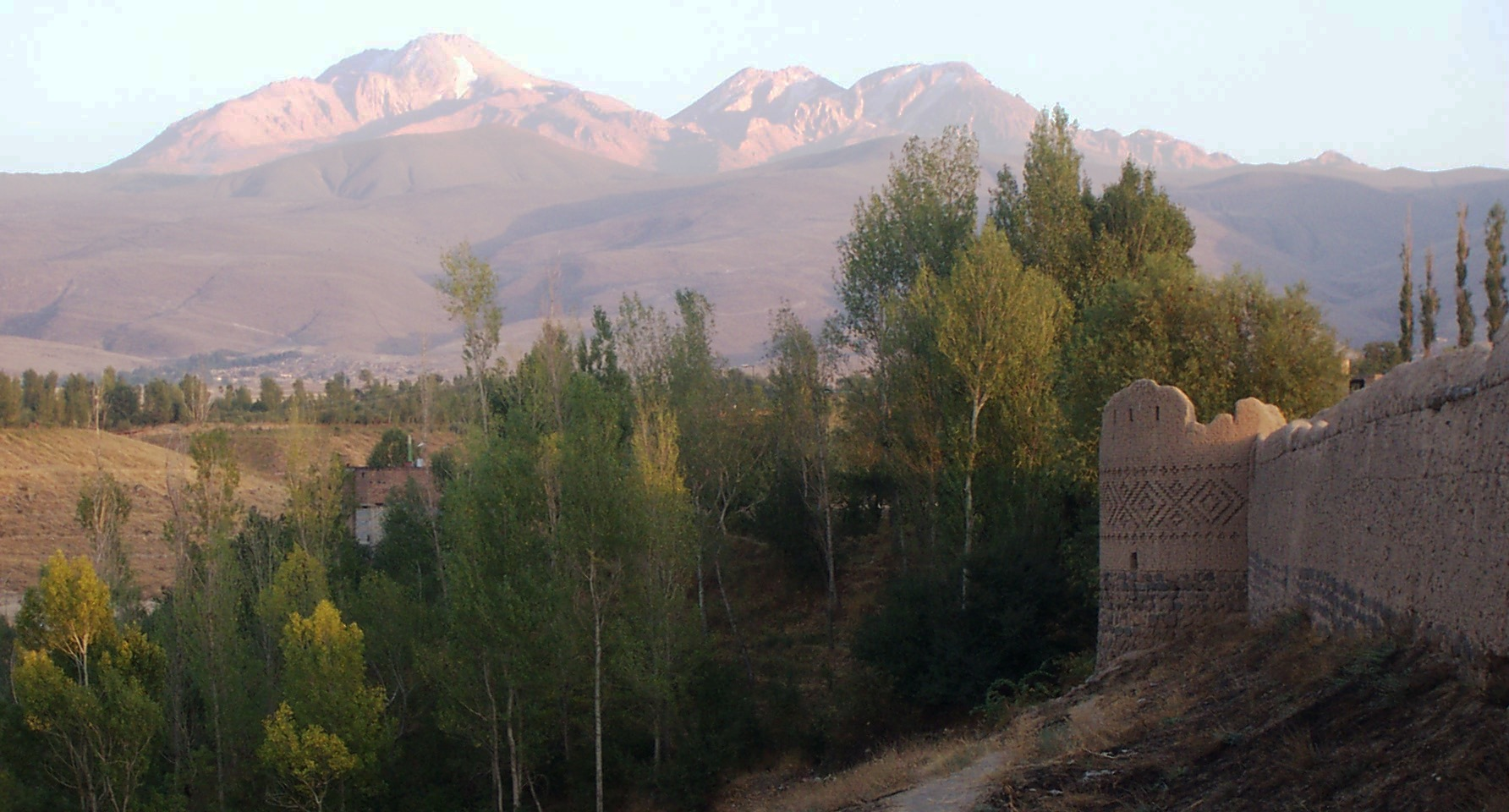
Arshoq Castle in Meshgin Shahr in foreground, Sabalan in background

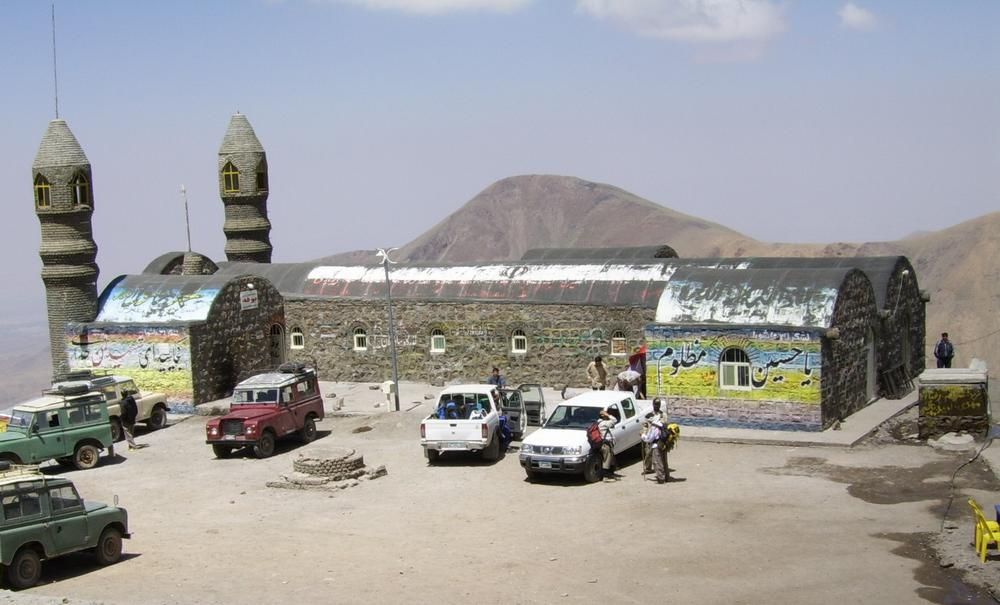
Shelter on Sabalan at 3,600 m

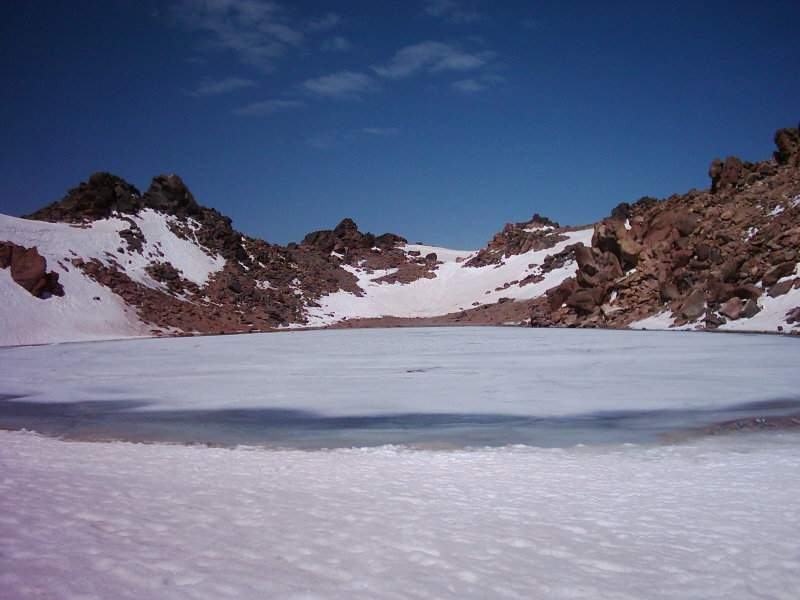
Crater lake of Sabalan

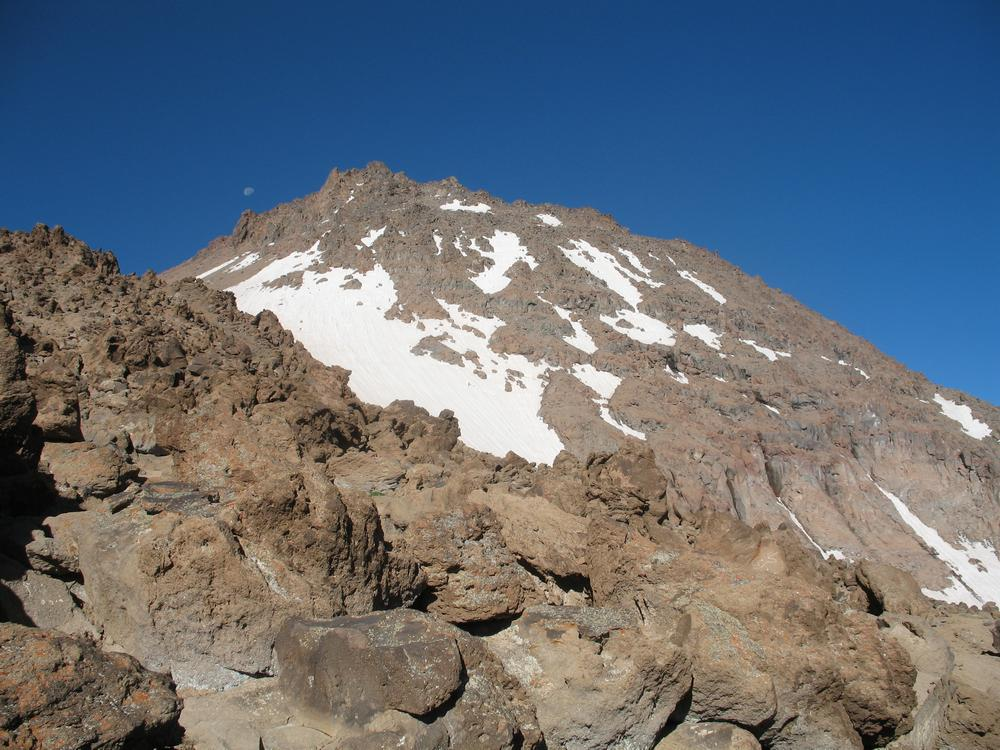
Sabalan landscape at 4,100 m

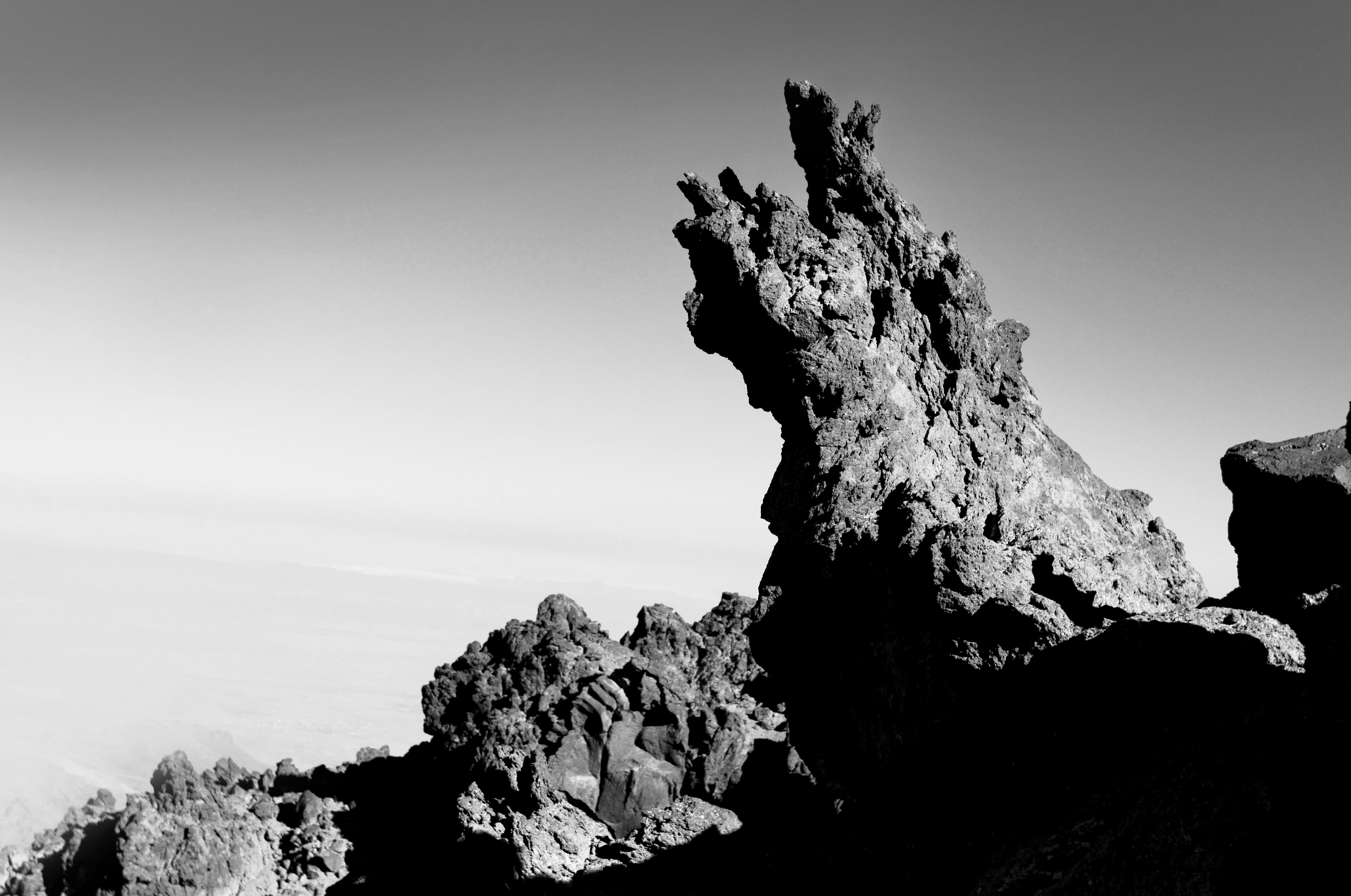
Igneous rock, Mr. Sabalan, Iran

== See also ==
- List of mountains in Iran
- List of volcanoes in Iran
- List of Ultras of West Asia

== Sources ==
- Chehabi, H. E. (1997). "Ardabil Becomes a Province: Center-Periphery Relations in Iran". International Journal of Middle East Studies. 29 (2): 235–253. doi:10.1017/S0020743800064485. JSTOR 164018. S2CID 162201104. (registration required)
