= Khashechal =

Mountain in the Alamut highlands, Qazvin Province, Iran

- Location within Iran

Highest point
- Elevation: 3,917 m (12,851 ft)
- Prominence: 622 m (2,041 ft)
- Coordinates: 36.5497°N 50.5103°E

Naming
- Native name: خشچال (Persian)

Geography
- Location: Qazvin Province, Iran
- Parent range: Alamut highlands, central Alborz

Khashechal (Persian: خشچال, also Khashteh-chal, خشته‌چال; sometimes called the Ovan Summit) is a mountain on the main ridge of the central Alborz, in the Alamut highlands of Qazvin Province, Iran. It overlooks the historic Alamut valley. Its elevation is reported as about 3,917 metres (12,851 ft) (PeakVisor) to 3,930 metres (12,890 ft), with older sources giving figures up to 4,180 metres (13,710 ft); it has a topographic prominence of 622 metres (2,041 ft).

== Geography and setting ==
Khashechal rises on the north-eastern ridge of the central Alborz, dividing the Alamut valley to the south from the Caspian slope to the north; the well-known Ovan Lake lies near its southern foot, and from the lake the peak is sometimes called the "Ovan Summit". To the south-west the ridge connects towards the summit of Sialan. Its nearest higher neighbour is the peak of Kandikan (3,998 metres (13,117 ft)), about 15 kilometres (9.3 mi) to the east. The mountain stands within the historic heartland of the Nizari Ismaili state, whose fortress of Alamut Castle guards the valley below.

== Climbing ==
Khashechal is approached from the west (from Varbon), from the north (the Chalkrud valley above Tonekabon), and from the south-west by way of the Sialan pass; a mountain refuge maintained by the Qazvin mountaineering federation stands at about 3,300 metres (10,800 ft).
