= Baghdasht Peak =

Mountain in Kuhsorkh County, Iran

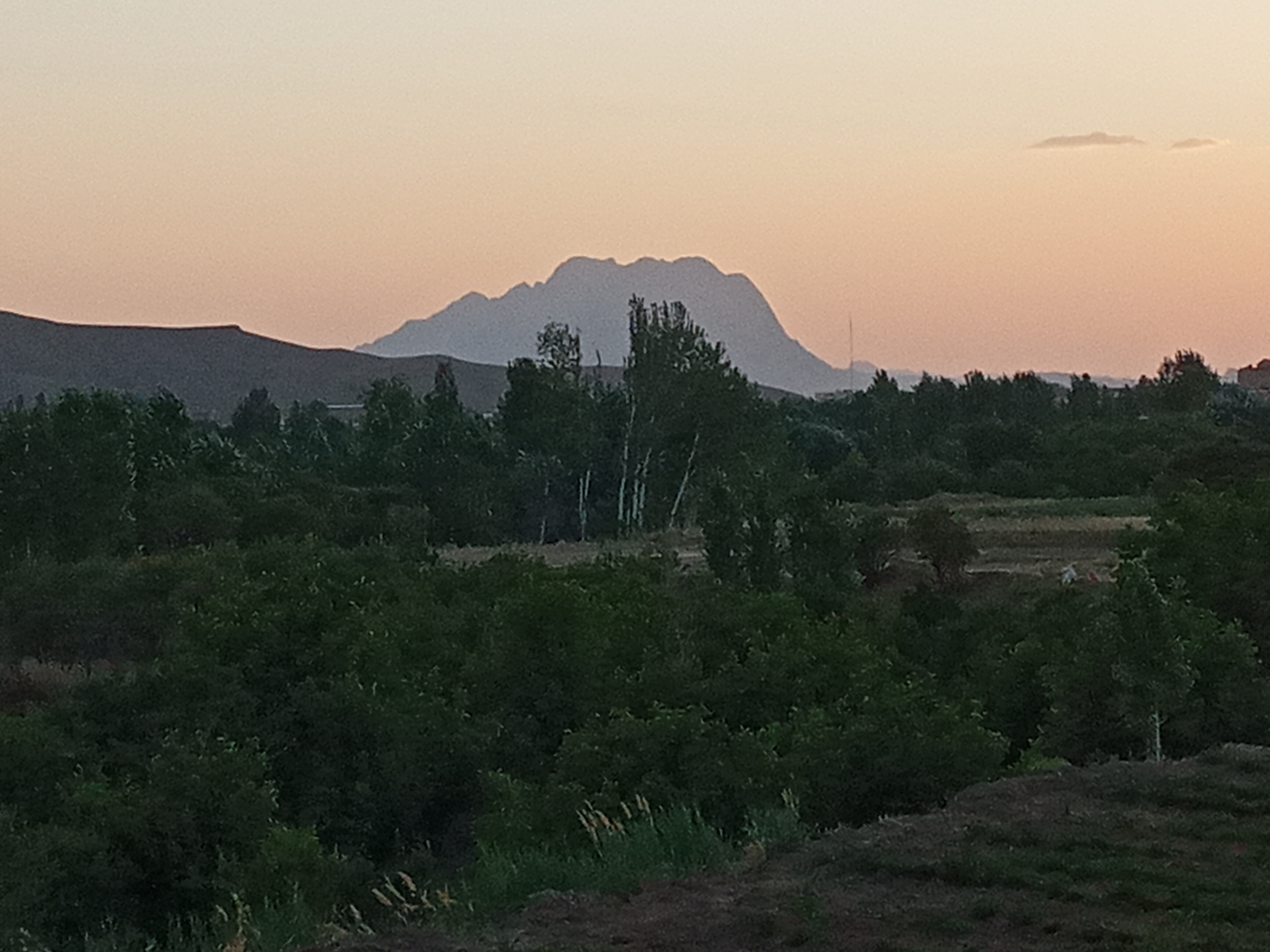

Highest point
- Elevation: 2,500 m (8,200 ft)
- Coordinates: 35°27′48″N 58°14′04″E

Naming
- Native name: کوه باغ دشت (Persian)

Geography
- Location within Iran
- Location: Razavi Khorasan Province, Iran
- Parent range: the Baghdasht range of the Kuhsorkh mountains

Baghdasht Peak (Persian: کوه باغ دشت) is a mountain in Razavi Khorasan Province, Iran. It rises to 2,500 metres (8,200 ft) and is part of the Baghdasht range of the Kuhsorkh mountains.
