= Birk Mountain =

Mountain in Iran

- Location within Iran

Highest point
- Elevation: 2,722 m (8,930 ft)
- Prominence: 1,260 m (4,130 ft)
- Coordinates: 27.589°N 61.334°E

Naming
- Native name: کوه بیرک (Persian)

Geography
- Location: Sistan and Baluchestan Province, Iran
- Parent range: the Baluchistan mountains

Birk Mountain (Persian: کوه بیرک) is a mountain in Sistan and Baluchestan Province, Iran. It rises to 2,722 metres (8,930 ft) and is part of the Baluchistan mountains.
