= Hazaran =

Massif of the Central Iranian Plateau

- Kuh-e Hazar
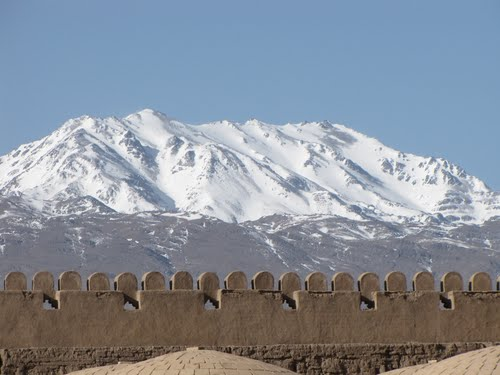
- Kuh-e Hazaran seen from Rayen Castle

Highest point
- Elevation: 4,500 m (14,800 ft)
- Prominence: 2,741 m (8,993 ft)
- Listing: Ultra
- Coordinates: 29°30′42″N 57°16′18″E

Geography
- Location within Iran
- Location: Central Iranian Plateau, Kerman Province, Iran
- Parent range: A central Iranian range (Sahand-Bazman volcanic belt or range) east and parallel to the Zagros Mountains

Hazaran, also Hazar or Hezar (Persian: کوه هزار), is a massif of the Central Iranian Plateau, and an eastern outlier of the Zagros Mountains. Hazaran is located in Kerman province, southeast Iran. With an elevation of 4,500 metres, it is the highest peak in Kerman province. The jebal Barez chain is a continuation to the south-east. The Halil River rises in the Bid Khan region. The massif is situated in the area encircled by the cities of Kerman, Bardsir, Sirjan, Baft, Jiroft and Bam.

Made chiefly of Eocene andesite and pyroclastic rocks, Mount Hazar or Hazaran is situated in a central Iranian range, Sahand-Bazman volcanic range or belt, a mountain range which was formed mainly during Eocene volcanism and that stretches approximately from Sahand Volcano in the north-west of Iran to Bazman Volcano in the south-east of Iran.

== Major peaks ==
- Kuh-e Hazaran (Kūh-e Hazār) 4500 m 29°30′42″N 57°16′18″E
- Kuh Shah 4380 m 29°23′28″N 56°44′50″E
- Kuh-e Palvar 4229 m 30°4′14″N 57°27′55″E
- Kuh-e Jupar 4150 m 29°55′N 57°12′E
- Kuh-e Khabr 3856 m 28°49′N 56°25′E
- Kuh-e Bidkhan 3424 m 29.604°N 56.547°E

== See also ==
- List of ultras of West Asia
