= Kholeno =

Mountain in Iran

- Location within Iran

Highest point
- Elevation: 4,375 m (14,354 ft)
- Coordinates: 36°3′53″N 51°33′7″E

Geography
- Location: Tehran, Iran
- Parent range: Alborz

Climbing
- Easiest route: South face via Lalan, Tehran village

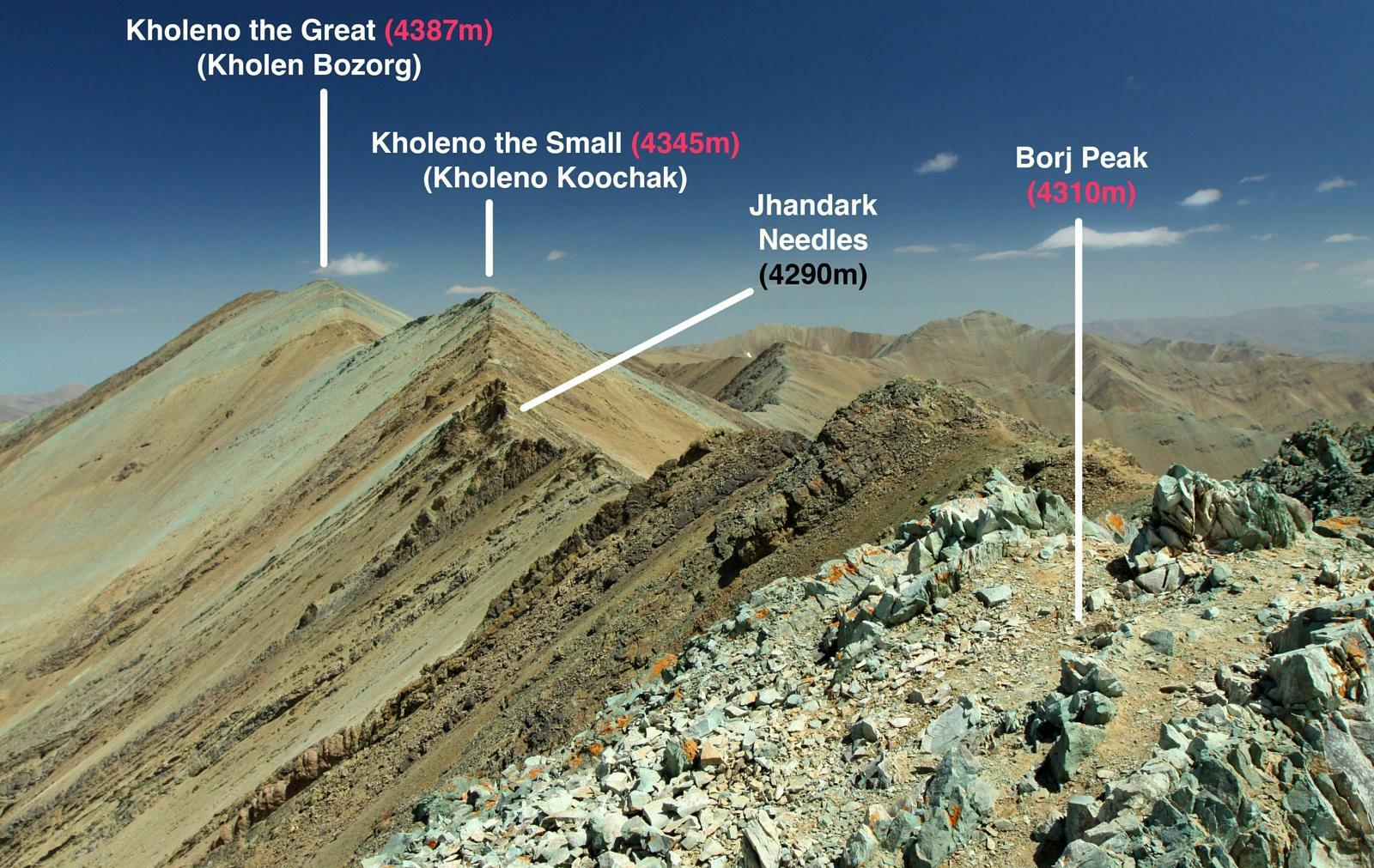
Kholeno ridge, Tehran province, Iran

Kholeno (Persian: خلنو) is a mountain in Iran in Kholeno/Azadkouh massif in central Alborz Range located in Tehran province near the border of Mazandaran Province. The most commonly used trail to the Kholeno summit is on the mountain's southern slopes, starting from Lalan. This route, however, is susceptible to avalanche risk during the winter.

Kholeno has two summits of which the tallest (4,375 m) is located north of the slightly shorter one (4,348 m).
