= List of Iranian four-thousanders =

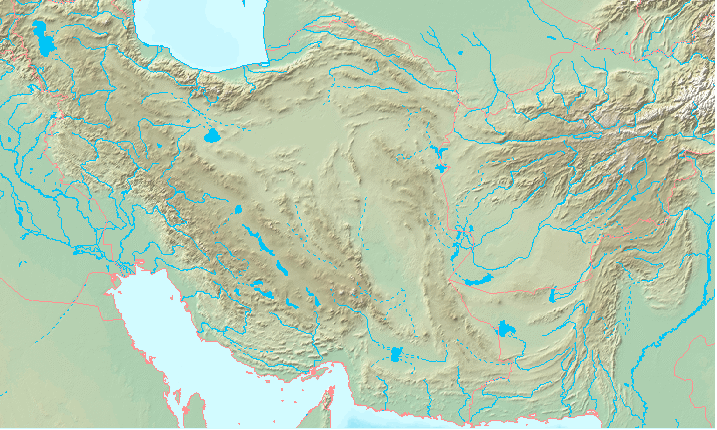

This list contains all of the summits and subsidiary tops of 4,000 metres (13,123 ft) above sea level or higher in Iran.

Since there is no precise or formal definition of a mountain summit, the number of 4000-metre summits or four-thousanders is arbitrary. Topographic prominence is an important factor in deciding the official nomination of a summit. The list here is based not only on prominence but also on other criteria, such as morphology (general appearance) and mountaineering interest. A minimum prominence criterion of 500 metres would considerably reduce the number of four-thousanders.

== List ==
The table shows the four-thousanders in Iran. There are several summits in the list with multiple peaks, where only the highest is listed.

Clicking the symbol at the head of the column sorts the table by that column's data.

Rank order	Persian name	Summit	Height (m)	Range	Sub-Range	Latitude	Longitude	Prominence (m)
1	دماوند	Damāvand	5,609	Alborz	Central Alborz	+35° 57′ 20″	+52° 06′ 36″	4685
2	علم کوه	Alam-Kuh	4,850	Alborz	Takht-e Suleyman	+36° 22' 32"	+50° 57' 42"	1872
3	سبلان	Sabalān	4,811	Alborz	Sabalan	+38° 16′ 1″	+47° 50′ 13″	3283
4	شاخک	Shākhak (5 peaks)	4,795	Alborz	Takht-e Suleyman	+36° 22' 29.36"	+50° 58' 6.09"	
5	خرسان شمالی	North Khersān	4,680	Alborz	Takht-e Suleyman	+36° 22' 6.22"	+50° 57' 14.18"	
6	خرسان جنوبی	South Khersān	4,659	Alborz	Takht-e Suleyman	+36° 21' 53.29"	+50° 57' 7.14"	
7	تخت سلیمان	Takhté Soleyman	4,665	Alborz	Takht-e Suleyman	+36° 23' 26.45"	+50° 57' 33.67"	281
8	سیاه سنگ	Siāh-Sang	4,606	Alborz	Takht-e Suleyman	+36° 22' 22.77"	+50° 58' 39.18"	
9	هرم	Heram	4,587	Alborz	Sabalan	+38° 15' 16.7"	+47° 48' 49.9"E	345
10	مرجی کش	Marji-Kesh	4,580	Alborz	Takht-e Suleyman	+36° 22' 2.86"	+50° 57' 58.55"	
11	کسری	Kasrā	4,577	Alborz	Sabalan	+38° 15' 10.8"	+47° 48' 19.5"	137
12	هفت خوان	Haft-Khān	4,539	Alborz	Takht-e Suleyman	+36° 22' 16.80"	+50° 56' 17.66"	130
13	چالون	Chāloun	4,516	Alborz	Takht-e Suleyman	+36° 22' 56.97"	+50° 59' 25.84"	103
14	هَزار	Hazār	4,500	Central Range	Hazaran massif	+29° 30' 42.1"	+57° 16' 17.9"	2741
15	سیاه گوگ	Siāh-Goog	4,500	Alborz	Takht-e Suleyman	+36° 23' 52.94"	+50° 57' 44.15"	
16	سیاه کمان	Siāh-Kamān	4,472	Alborz	Takht-e Suleyman	+36° 23' 30.4"	+50° 59' 27.1"	107
17	میش چال	Mish-Chāl	4,470	Alborz	Takht-e Suleyman	+36° 24' 5.75"	+50° 57' 43.69"	
18	شانه کوه	Shāneh-Kuh	4,465	Alborz	Takht-e Suleyman	+36° 22' 56.47"	+50° 57' 43.71"	
19	رستم نیشت	Rostam-Nisht	4,426	Alborz	Takht-e Suleyman	+36° 24' 29.37"	+50° 57' 33.80"	
20	کالو	Kāloo	4,412	Alborz	Takht-e Suleyman	+36° 26' 44.87"	+50° 56' 55.95"	305
21	(لاله زار (ننو	Nenoo (Laleh-Zār)	4,403	Central Range	Hazaran massif	+29° 24' 09"	+56° 48' 51"	540
22	گردون کوه	Gardoon-Kuh	4,402	Alborz	Takht-e Suleyman	+36° 20' 34.40"	+50° 57' 30.71"	113
23	قُبی	Ghobi	4,399	Alborz	Takht-e Suleyman	+36° 26' 54.06"	+50° 56' 31.54"	
24	(کوه شاه (کله برفی	Kuhe'-Shāh (Kalleh-Barfi)	4,392	Central Range	Hazaran massif	+29° 23' 28"	+56° 44' 50"	1384
25	کلاچ بند	Kalāch-Band	4,392	Alborz	Takht-e Suleyman	+36° 23' 5.80"	+50° 59' 58.56"	
26	مور گل	Moor-Gol	4,380	Zagros	Dena	+30° 57' 44.00"	+51° 25' 26.00"	243
27	منار	Menār	4,378	Alborz	Takht-e Suleyman	+36° 21' 6.13"	+50° 57' 39.06"	
28	خُلنو بزرگ	Greate Kholeno	4,375	Alborz	Kholeno massif	+36° 3' 52.96"	+51° 33' 6.94"	740
29	ماش	Māsh (Bijan I)	4,370	Zagros	Dena	+30° 55' 57.00"	+51° 28' 11.00"	232
30	آزادکوه	Azād Kuh	4,355	Alborz	Kholeno massif	+36° 10' 9.00"	+51° 30' 8.00"	960
31	یاپراق	Yāprāgh	4,350	Northwest Ranges	Sabalan	+38° 16' 40.1"	+47° 50' 01.8"	
32	خُلنو کوچک	Small Kholeno	4,348	Alborz	Kholeno massif	+36° 3' 38.10"	+51° 33' 9.26"	
33	میان سه چال	Miān-Seh-Chāl	4,348	Alborz	Takht-e Suleyman	+36° 23' 11.53"	+50° 58' 29.09"	
34	سه قپه آسمانی	Seh-Ghoppeh-Āsemāni (Bijan II)	4,340	Zagros	Dena	+30° 56' 14.00"	+51° 27' 3.00"	
35	دوخواهران غربی	West Do-Khāharān	4,338	Alborz	Do Khvaharan massif	+36° 2' 1.29",	+51° 55' 14.83"	644
36	تنگه گلو	Tangeh-Geloo	4,335	Alborz	Takht-e Suleyman	+36° 21' 57.64"	+50° 59' 3.56"	
37	هزارچم	Hezār-Cham	4,317	Alborz	Takht-e Suleyman	+36° 20' 20.83"	+50° 57' 45.70"	
38	هرا شرقی	East Harā	4,310	Zagros	Dena	+30° 55' 20.51"	+51° 29' 0.65"	
39	دو خواهران شرقی	East Do-Khāharān	4,310	Alborz	Do Khvaharan massif	+36° 1' 55.04"	+51° 55' 22.25"	644
40	قاش مستان	Ghāsh-Mastān (Bijan III)	4,412	Zagros	Dena	+30° 57' 6.00"	+51° 26' 10.00"	2604
41	هرم	Heram	4,305	Zagros	Dena	+30° 56' 39.12"	+51° 26' 57.12"	100
42	بن رو	Bon-Ro	4,300	Zagros	Dena	+30° 56' 43.60"	+51° 26' 11.02"	
43	لوی نا	Loinā	4,300	Alborz	Takht-e Suleyman	+36° 27' 1.77"	+50° 55' 53.2"	
44	ستاره	Setāreh	4,296	Alborz	Takht-e Suleyman	+36° 21' 24.92"	+50° 57' 24.84"	
45	برج	Borj	4,293	Alborz	Kholeno massif	+36° 3' 13.00"	+51° 33' 2.15"	
46	هرا غربی	West Harā	4,280	Zagros	Dena	+30° 55' 16.80"	+51° 28' 40.26"	
47	کل بلبل	Kale'-Bolbol	4,280	Zagros	Dena	+31° 3' 9.50"	+51° 20' 49.51"	371
48	شکر لقاس (ناظر بزرگ)	Shekar-Loghās (Great Nāzer)	4,278	Alborz	Do Khvaharan massif	+36° 5' 11.00"	+51° 57' 8.00"	503
49	هرزه کوه	Harzeh-Kuh	4,268	Alborz	Kholeno massif	+36° 3' 3.00"	+51° 32' 36.00"	
50	چپکرو	Chapak-Roo	4,260	Alborz	Do Khvaharan massif	+36° 1' 49.54"	+51° 56' 11.22"	
51	کله گردنک	Koleh-Gerdenak	4,260	Alborz	Takht-e Suleyman	+36° 23' 33.04"	+51° 0' 26.99"	
52	لشگرک بزرگ	Greate Lashgarak	4,256	Alborz	Takht-e Suleyman	+36° 20' 7.64"	+50° 58' 45.80"	
53	پالون گردن	Paloon-Gardan	4,256	Alborz	Kholeno massif	+36° 5' 8.13"	+51° 35' 14.09"	
54	خرس چال	Khers-Chāl	4,253	Alborz	Kholeno massif	+36° 3' 16.00"	+51° 32' 19.00"	
55	میش چال	Mish-Chāl	4,253	Alborz	Kholeno massif	+36° 4' 7.70"	+51° 33' 44.46"	
56	پازن پیر	Pāzan-Pir	4,250	Zagros	Dena	+30° 47' 19.20"	+51° 38' 57.71"	1033
57	قزل قله	Ghezel-Gholleh	4,250	Zagros	Dena	+30° 56' 27.04"	+51° 26' 51.19"	
58	ابیدر	Abeedar	4,250	Alborz	Takht-e Suleyman	+36° 22' 35.6"	+51° 03' 53.9"	473
59	تخت رستم	Takhte'-Rostam	4,246	Alborz	Takht-e Suleyman	+36° 25' 11.77"	+50° 57' 21.29"	
60	کمان کوه	Kamān-Kuh	4,234	Alborz	Kholeno massif	+36° 7' 46.28"	+51° 28' 13.84"	518
61	پلوار	Palvār	4,233	Central Range	Hazaran massif	+30° 04' 12.1"	+57° 27' 56.8"	1970
62	زرد گل	Zard-Gel	4,231	Alborz	Takht-e Suleyman	+36° 21' 36.24"	+50° 58' 31.89"	
63	کلون چین	Kolunchin	4,221	Zagros	Zard-Kuh	+32° 21' 52.53"	+50° 4' 38.77"	2095
64	فراخه نو	Farākheh-no	4,210	Alborz	Kholeno massif	+36° 3' 31.98"	+51° 31' 30.98"	
65	سرکچال	Sarakchāl	4,210	Alborz	Kholeno massif	+36° 1' 42.05"	+51° 32' 21.83"	289
66	کپیری	Kapiri	4,210	Zagros	Dena	+30° 55' 41.32"	+51° 27' 36.76"	
67	سی یونه زا	Si-Yoneh-Zā	4,208	Alborz	Kholeno massif	+36° 04' 09.6"	+51° 32' 52.1"	
68	نرگس	Narges	4,206	Alborz	Kholeno massif	+36° 5' 57.07"	+51° 35' 6.94"	
69	سرخرسنگ	Sar-Khar-Sang	4,203	Alborz	Kholeno massif	+36° 4' 44.28"	+51° 33' 49.71"	
70	اسبی چال	Asbi-Chāl	4,200	Alborz	Kholeno massif	+36° 04' 21.2"	+51° 32' 42.2"	
71	کل شیدا	Kale'-Sheydā	4,200	Zagros	Dena	+31° 3' 17.97"	+51° 20' 22.17"	
72	تل گردل	Tal-Gardal	4,200	Zagros	Dena	+30° 58' 51.58"	+51° 23' 25.86"	
73	اهرام لوکوره	Ahrām-Lokooreh	4,200	Zagros	Dena	+30° 59' 27.07"	+51° 23' 36.99"	
74	نفار نقار	Nefār-Neghār	4,199	Alborz	Takht-e Suleyman	+36° 25' 57.14"	+50° 57' 8.77"	
75	زرین کوه	Zarrin-Kuh	4,198	Alborz	Takht-e Suleyman	+36° 16' 43.46"	+51° 3' 36.71"	
76	یخچال	Yakh-Chāl	4,194	Alborz	Kholeno massif	+36° 7' 31.43"	+51° 29' 7.76"	
77	کل خرمن	Kale'-Kharman	4,190	Zagros	Dena	+30° 50' 21.46"	+51° 35' 6.45"	
78	سرکوله	Sar-Koule'	4,188	Alborz	Do Khvaharan massif	+36° 05' 32.7"	+51° 56' 58.2"	
79	سیالان	Siālān	4,185	Alborz	West Alborz	+36° 30' 41.89"	+50° 41' 54.63"	1164
80	دیوچال	Div-Chāl	4,185	Alborz	Takht-e Suleyman	+36° 21' 42.3"	+51° 02' 53.9"	
81	لشگرک کوچک	Small Lashgarak	4,184	Alborz	Takht-e Suleyman	+36° 19' 41.25"	+50° 58' 53.37"	
82	سیچانی	Sichāni	4,180	Zagros	Dena	+30° 53' 46.00"	+51° 29' 42.00"	
83	تخت خرس	Takhte'-Khers	4,178	Alborz	Do Khvaharan massif	+36° 2' 39.39"	+51° 54' 45.30"	
84	سرماهو	Sar-Māhoo	4,165	Alborz	Kholeno massif	+36° 7' 30.80"	+51° 28' 35.32"	
85	کلون بستک	Koloon-Bastak	4,156	Alborz	Kholeno massif	+36° 3' 12.63"	+51° 27' 55.31"	
86	سیاه غار	Siāh Ghār (Sarakchāl II)	4,152	Alborz	Kholeno massif	+36° 1' 43"	+51° 31' 59"	
87	قبله	Ghebleh	4,150	Zagros	Dena	+30° 57' 39.38"	+51° 26' 26.86"	
88	قلات بزی	Ghalāt'e-Bozi	4,150	Zagros	Dena	+31° 0' 25.21"	+51° 22' 32.10"	
89	کاهو	Kāhoo	4,150	Alborz	Do Khvaharan massif	+36° 2' 51.26"	+51° 54' 16.56"	
90	خرسان	Khersān	4,150	Zagros	Zard-Kuh	+32° 22' 12"	+50° 04' 58.4"	
91	سن بران	San-Borān	4,139	Zagros	Oshtoran Kuh	+33° 20' 24.83"	+49° 18' 15.88"	1986
92	جوپار	Jupār	4,135	Central Range	Hazaran massif	+29° 54' 39.0"	+57° 12' 06.1"	1597
93	سه سنگ	Seh-Sang	4,135	Alborz	Do Khvaharan massif	+36° 01' 22.6"	+51° 56' 49.5"	
94	دال کولی	Dāl-Kowli	4,130	Alborz	Kholeno massif	+36° 4' 4.70"	+51° 30' 7.08"	
95	چال وهلی	Chāle'-Vohli	4,130	Zagros	Dena	+31° 2' 0.14"	+51° 21' 9.57"	
96	پالوان	Pālvān	4,126	Alborz	Kholeno massif	+36° 5' 4.01"	+51° 34' 33.74"	
97	شاه البرز	Shāh-Alborz	4,125	Alborz	Shah-Alborz	+36° 18' 51.34"	+50° 45' 11.45"	931
98	بند دال کولی	Band-Dāl-Koli	4,118	Alborz	Kholeno massif	+36° 3' 44.97"	+51° 30' 59.15"	
99	کل قدویس	Kale'-Ghodveis	4,110	Zagros	Dena	+31° 3' 52.38"	+51° 20' 5.33"	
100	برف کرمو	Barf-Kermoo	4,110	Zagros	Dena	+30° 51' 50.85"	+51° 33' 3.47"	
101	برف چال	Barf-Chāl	4,110	Zagros	Dena	+30° 46' 54.06"	+51° 39' 15.50"	
102	لوکوره مرکزی	Central Lokooreh	4,110	Zagros	Dena	+31° 0' 12.50"	+51° 23' 28.02"	
103	یخ کمر	Yakh-Kamar	4,110	Alborz	Do Khvaharan massif	+36° 2' 41.14"	+51° 54' 54.57"	
104	ناز	Nāz	4,108	Alborz	Kahar	+36° 6' 30.28"	+51° 2' 27.50"	974
105	نول شمالی	North Nevel	4,100	Zagros	Dena	+30° 49' 21.76"	+51° 36' 48.11"	
106	گدار کج اندر کج	Godāre'-Kaj-Andar-Kaj	4,100	Central Range	Hazaran massif	+29° 26' 8.7"	+56° 46' 4.9"	
107	گلچین	Golchin	4,093	Central Range	Hazaran massif	+30° 01' 17.4"	+57° 31' 01"	
108	مازی گردن	Māzi-Gardan	4,090	Alborz	Takht-e Suleyman	+36° 27' 50.5"	+50° 55' 33.3"	
109	درویش کزلی	Darvish-Kezli	4,086	Zagros	Zard-Kuh	+32° 17' 6.66"	+50° 8' 28.74"	
110	گل گهر	Gol-Gahar	4,084	Zagros	Oshtoran Kuh	+33° 20' 23.77"	+49° 17' 48.69"	
111	کهنو	Koheno	4,082	Alborz	Kholeno massif	+36° 7' 15.33"	+51° 29' 38.66"	
112	میرزایی	Mirzāei	4,081	Zagros	Oshtoran Kuh	+33° 20' 9.93"	+49° 18' 21.54"	
113	کول کولایو	Kole'-Kolāyo	4,080	Zagros	Oshtoran Kuh	+33° 20' 22.99"	+49° 17' 55.13"	
114	کلوان	Kelvān	4,078	Alborz	Takht-e Suleyman	+36° 19' 57.19"	+50° 54' 45.87"	
115	کاعون	Kāoon	4,075	Alborz	Do Khvaharan massif	+36° 3' 39.35"	+51° 58' 58.67"	
116	فیالستون	Fiyāleston	4,075	Zagros	Oshtoran Kuh	+33° 20' 8.82"	+49° 18' 23.80"	
117	کوله	Koule'	4,074	Alborz	Do Khvaharan massif	+36° 4' 41.41"	+51° 56' 36.36"	
118	دوبرار	Do-Berār	4,072	Alborz	Do-Berar ridge	+35° 45' 47.46"	+52° 16' 11.16"	1352
119	هفت تنان	Haft-Tanan	4,070	Zagros	Zard-Kuh	+32° 30' 13.00"	+49° 57' 26.00"	
120	میش چال	Mish-Chāl	4,067	Alborz	Takht-e Suleyman	+36° 19' 44.74"	+50° 56' 23.51"	
121	گل گل	Gol-Gol	4,060	Zagros	Oshtoran Kuh	+33° 20' 38.72"	+49° 17' 19.57"	
122	قره داغ	Ghareh Dagh	4,057	Alborz	Do-Berar ridge			
123	شیرکوه	Shir Kuh	4,055	Central Range	Shir Kuh Range	+31° 36′ 21″	+54° 04′ 06″	2271
124	آلانه سر	Ālāneh-Sar	4,050	Alborz	Takht-e Suleyman	+36° 18' 29.18"	+50° 59' 56.86"	
125	میشینه نو	Mishineh-no	4,050	Alborz	Kahar	+36° 6' 27.40"	+51° 3' 2.57"	
126	برد آتش	Bard-Ātash	4,050	Zagros	Dena	+30° 53' 57.40"	+51° 30' 59.46"	
127	نِوِل جنوبی	South Nevel	4,050	Zagros	Dena	+30° 48' 54.30"	+51° 36' 30.34"	
128	چری	Chary	4,050	Zagros	Zard-Kuh	+32° 17′ 33″	+50° 05′ 40.3″	
129	سرمِشک	Sar-Meshk	4,048	Central Range	Hazaran massif	+29° 22' 32"	+57° 11' 21"	709
130	نظرکوه	Nazar-Kuh	4,047	Alborz	Takht-e Suleyman	+36° 19' 42.75"	+50° 55' 20.01"	
131	انگمار	Angemār	4,044	Alborz	Do-Berar ridge	+35° 46' 4.67"	+52° 12' 46.01"	
132	چات سبز	Chāte'-Sabz	4,040	Zagros	Dena	+31° 3' 57.94"	+51° 19' 33.19"	
133	خشکه در	Khoske'-Dar	4,040	Alborz	Takht-e Suleyman	+36° 23' 11.4"	+51° 03' 57.9"	
134	دره خونی	Darreh-Khooni	4,039	Alborz	Do Khvaharan massif	+36° 2' 52.63"	+51° 52' 39.23"	
135	شاهان کوه	Shāhān-Kuh	4,038	Zagros	Shahan-Kuh	+32° 48' 12.8"	+49° 58' 54.4"	
136	ورزاب	Varzāb	4,036	Alborz	Kholeno massif	+36° 2' 50.64"	+51° 34' 55.68"	
137	شاه شهیدان	Shāh-Shahidan	4,030	Zagros	Zard-Kuh	+32° 22' 41"	+50° 4' 09"	
138	وروشت	Varavasht	4,030	Alborz	Central Alborz	+36° 17' 12.85"	+51° 21' 15.62"	860
139	کل پازنی	Kale'-Pāzani	4,020	Zagros	Dena	+31° 3' 57.94"	+51° 19' 33.19"	
140	کرما	Kormā	4,020	Alborz	Takht-e Suleyman	+36° 27' 24.39"	+51° 0' 16.49"	345
141	کهار	Kahār	4,015	Alborz	Kahar	+36° 7' 2.00"	+51° 5' 6.00"	
142	تپو	Tapoo	4,010	Zagros	Dena	+30° 48' 8.84"	+51° 37' 50.57"	
143	هفت سران	Haft-Sarān	4,007	Alborz	Do Khvaharan massif	+36° 3' 34.23"	+51° 55' 45.55"	
144	سات	Sāt	4,003	Alborz	Shah-Alborz	+36° 17' 44.11"	+50° 49' 12.46"	428
145	پسنده کوه	Pasande'-Kuh	4,000	Alborz	Takht-e Suleyman	+36° 24' 6.74"	+51° 1' 0.52"	
146	ماشل نو	Māshel-no	4,000	Alborz	Takht-e Suleyman	+36° 23' 56.30"	+51° 0' 41.52"	
147	سردشت	Sar-Dasht	4,000	Alborz	Takht-e Suleyman	+36° 21' 29.52"	+50° 58' 55.07"	

== See also ==
- Iranian plateau
- List of Ultras of West Asia
- Four-thousanders

== Bibliography ==
- Ali Moghim, Mountaineering in Iran, Rozaneh, 3rd edition, 2006, ISBN 964-334-060-0 (in Persian: کوهنوردی در ایران)
