= Takht-e Suleyman Massif =

Mountain range in Iran

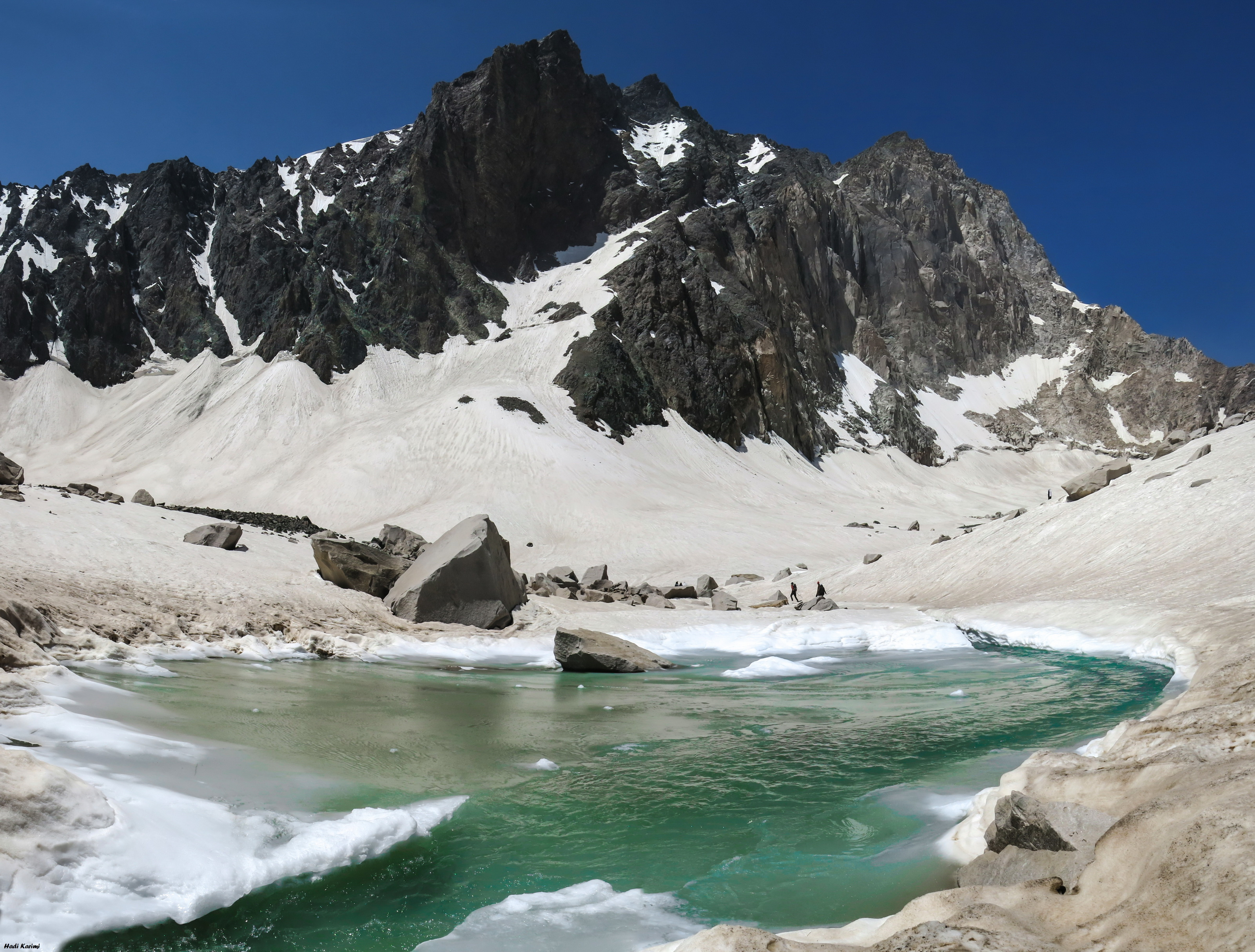
Takht-e Soleyman Alam kuh

Takht-e Soleyman Massif (Persian: گرانکوه تخت سليمان) is a subrange of central Alborz mountains, in northern Iran. In the area, about 160 distinct peaks higher than 4,000m are distinguishable, with the highest: Alam Kuh, 4,850m. The area can be captured inside a rectangle of 30 km width and 40 km length. The massif is limited to Taleqan valley from south, Kelardasht green plane from east, Abbas Abad rain forest & thick vegetated hills/slopes at north, and Shahsavar rain forests and Se Hezar valley at west.

== Discovery ==
The original and pre Islamic name is Takht-e-Jamshid - The Takht-e-Soleiman region was virtually unknown until the 1930s. Freya Stark travelled there in 1931 and described her thwarted efforts to climb Takht-e Suleyman in The Valleys of the Assassins. Douglas Busk, a British mountaineer, explored the area in 1932, and made the first recorded ascent of Alam Kuh in 1933 via the east ridge. Later on, Busk along with Professor Bobek made a detailed survey of this area.
