= Geology of Iran =

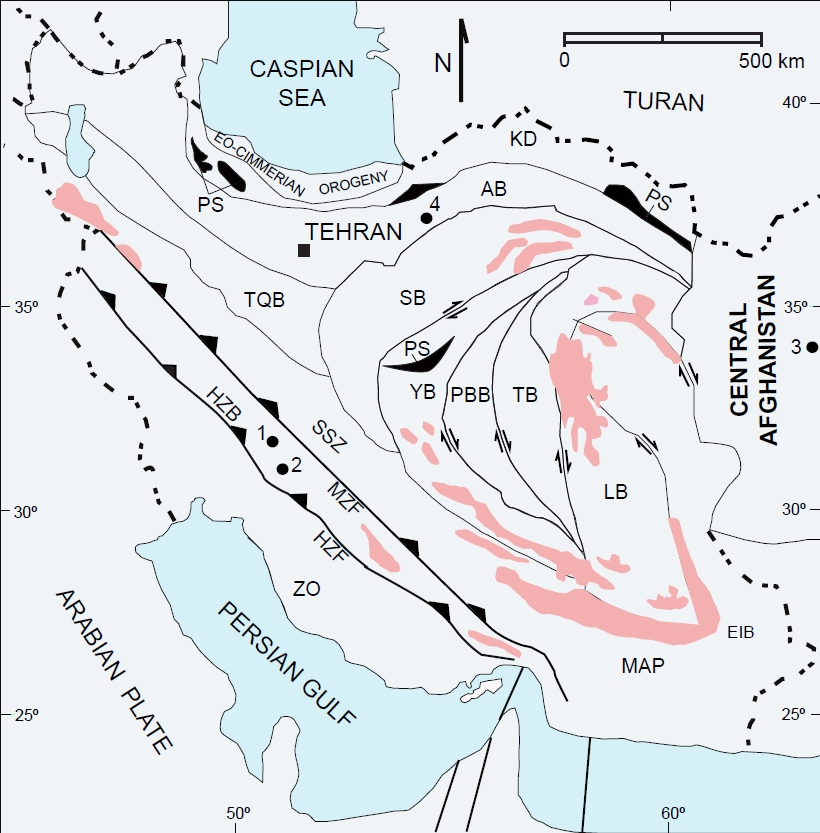
Structural geological features of Iran. • LB - Lut Block • TB - Tabas Block • PBB - Posht-e-Badam Block • YB - Yazd Block • SSZ - Sanandaj-Sirjan Zone • HZF - High Zagros Fault • SB - Sabzevar Block • EIB East Iran Block • AB - Alborz Belt • MAP - Makran Accretionary Prism • MZF - Main Zagros Fault • TQB - Tabriz-Qom Block • ZO - Zagros Orogen • KD - Kopeh Dagh • PS - Paleo Tethys Suture • HZB - High Zagros

The main points that are discussed in the geology of Iran include the study of the geological and structural units or zones; stratigraphy; magmatism and igneous rocks; ophiolite series and ultramafic rocks; and orogenic events in Iran.

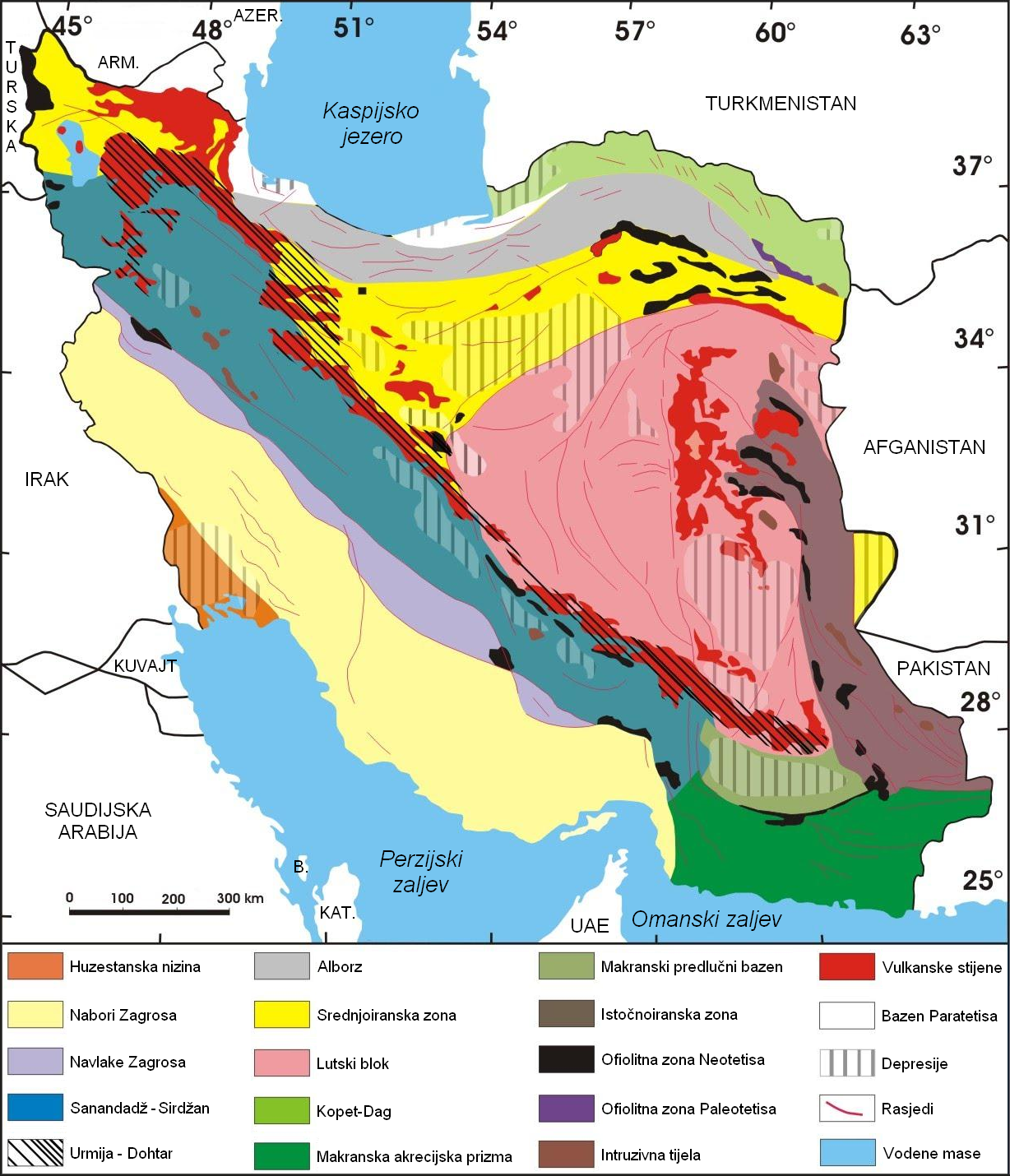
Geological zones of Iran (Cro)

== Geological and structural units of Iran ==
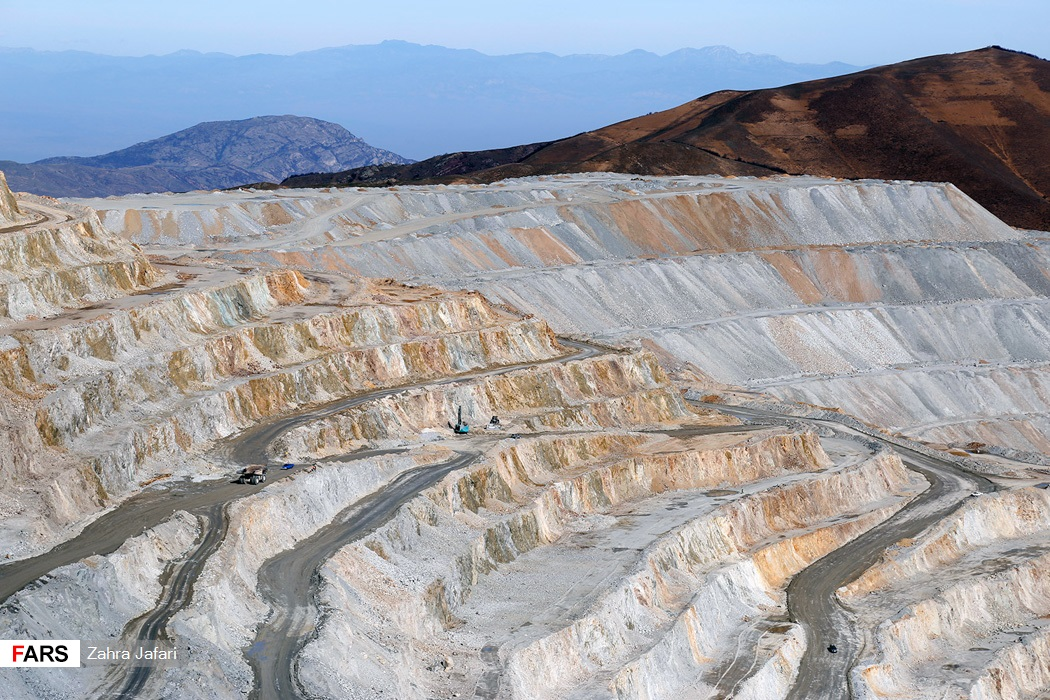
Sungun Copper Mine

Considering geological and structural units of Iran, three main structural units or zones could be distinguished in Iran. These units or zones are separated from each other by ophiolite–bearing sutures. Other criteria such as structural style, crustal character and age of basement consolidation, age and intensity of deformation, age and nature of magmatism, are used to subdivide these major zones into smaller elements. The three major units and their main constituents could be defined as the southern, central and northern units. The southern unit has a crystalline basement consolidated in the Precambrian time and a platform–type Paleozoic development and comprises the Zagros folded belt, southern and southwestern parts of the Zagros Mountains. This section made a part of the Arabian plate that was located on the margin of Rodinia and Pannotia in the Neoproterozoic, and of Gondwana in the Paleozoic and Mesozoic.

The central unit, which comprises the central Iran and the Alborz, is interpreted as an assemblage of fragments that were in the vicinity of the Arabian plate and formed a marginal section of Rodinia and Pannotia in the Neoproterozoic and of Gondwana in the Cambrian, Ordovician, Silurian and Devonian. These fragments were detached from Gondwana in the Carboniferous. They were submerged, moved northwards, and were finally attached to the Eurasian section of the northern supercontinent Laurasia in the Late Triassic. These fragments or microplates were fused together and made the Iranian plate which was rejoined by Gondwanic Afro-Arabia in the Late Cretaceous. As Afro-Arabia moved northwards towards Eurasia, the Arabian plate ultimately collided with the Iranian plate in the Miocene. Finally there is the northern unit which is separated from the central unit by the North Iran Suture. It is characterized by continental crust including remnants of more or less cratonized former Paleozoic oceanic crust that seems to reflect the Paleotethys. The northern unit represents a marginal strip of the Hercynian realm of Central Asia- broadly overlapped by the Alpine realm. It was deformed and largely consolidated by the Early Cimmerian folding and the Late Alpine folding. The northern unit comprises the South Caspian Depression and the Kopet Dagh Range. These three main structural units are divided into some smaller geological and structural subdivisions which include the following zones:

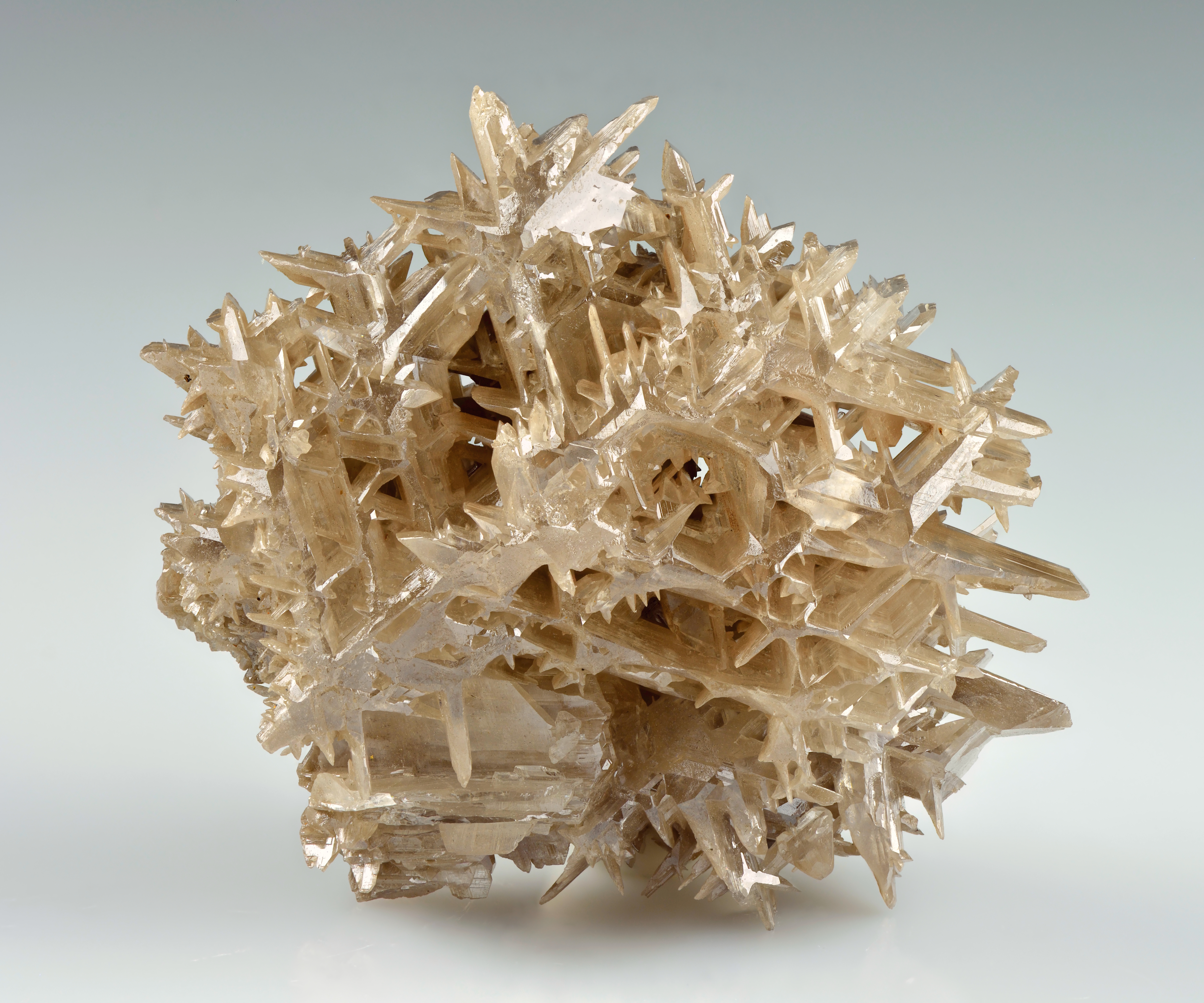
Cerussite - Nakhlak mine, Anarak, Esfahan, Iran

=== Zagros ===
This zone extends from Bandar Abbas in the south to Kermanshah in the northwest and continues through to Iraq. Zagros is in fact the northeastern edge of the Arabian plate. Some important features of Zagros include: Absence of magmatic and metamorphic events after Triassic, and low abundance of the outcrops of Paleozoic rocks. Structurally, it consists of large anticlines and small synclines and continuous marine sedimentation from the Carboniferous to the Miocene. On the whole, a sequence of Precambrian to Pliocene rocks about 8-10 kilometres in thickness has undergone folding from the Miocene to the Recent time in the Zagros Mountains. The Zagros fold and thrust belt was formed by the collision of two tectonic plates – the Iranian plate and the Arabian plate. This collision primarily happened during the Miocene and folded the entire rocks that had been deposited from the Carboniferous to the Miocene in the geosyncline in front of the Iranian plate. The process of collision continues to the present and as the Arabian plate is being pushed against the Iranian plate, the Zagros Mountains and the Iranian plateau are getting higher and higher. The Zagros mountain range, itself, has a totally sedimentary origin and is made primarily of limestone. In the Elevated Zagros or the Higher Zagros, the Paleozoic rocks could be found mainly in the upper and higher sections of the peaks of the Zagros Mountains along the Zagros main fault. On the both sides of this fault, there are Mesozoic rocks, a combination of Triassic and Jurassic rocks that are surrounded by Cretaceous rocks on the both sides. The Folded Zagros (the mountains south of the Elevated Zagros and almost parallel to the main Zagros fault) is formed mainly of Tertiary rocks, with the Paleogene rocks south of the Cretaceous rocks and then the Neogene rocks south of the Paleogene rocks.

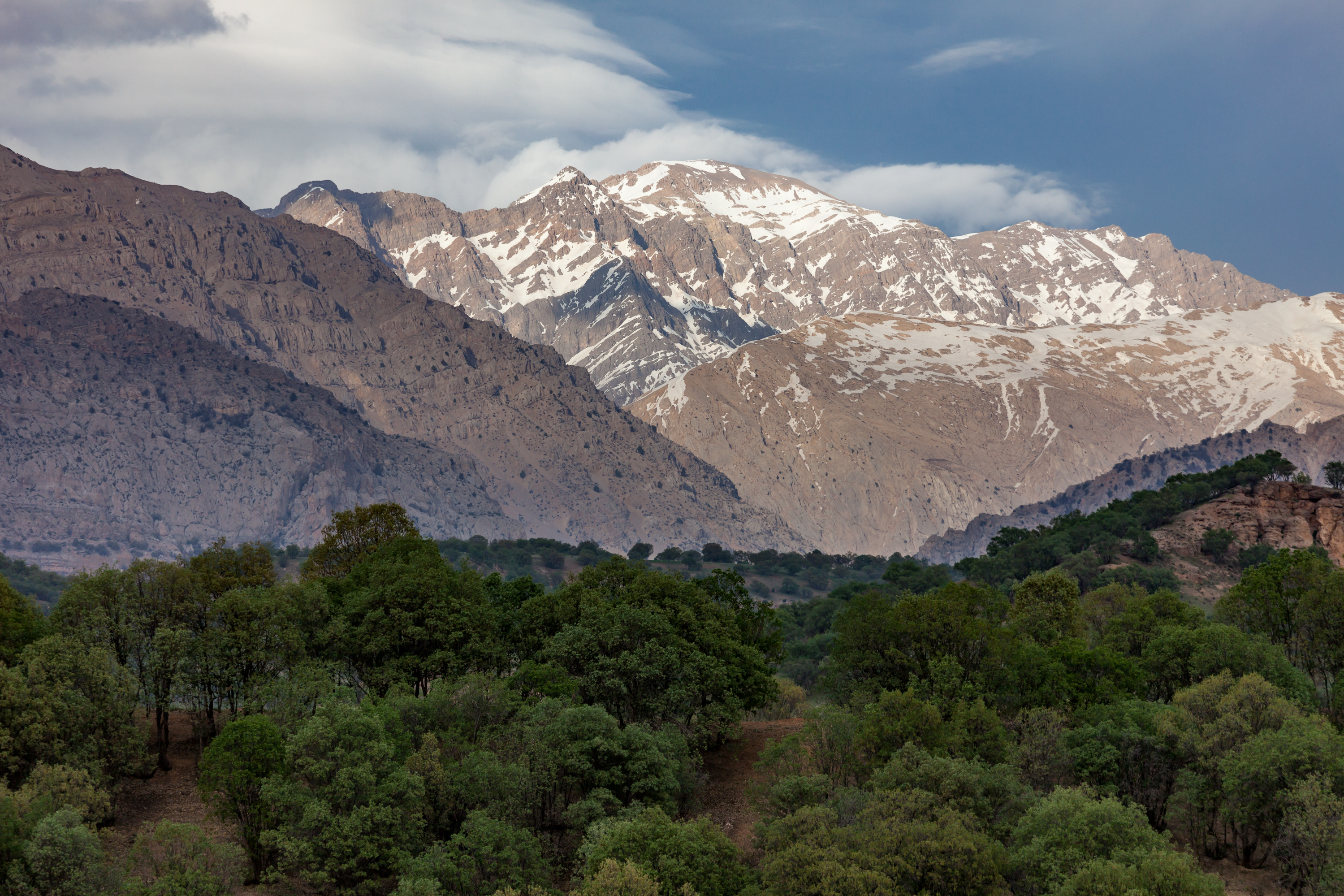
Zagros Mountains - Kohgiluyeh and Boyer-Ahmad Province

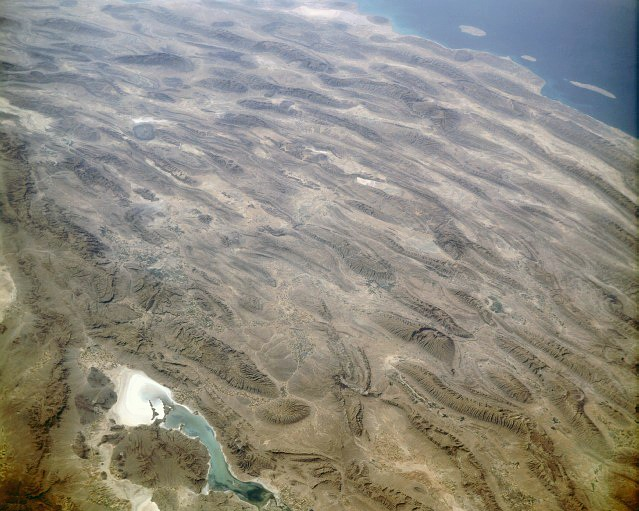
Zagros

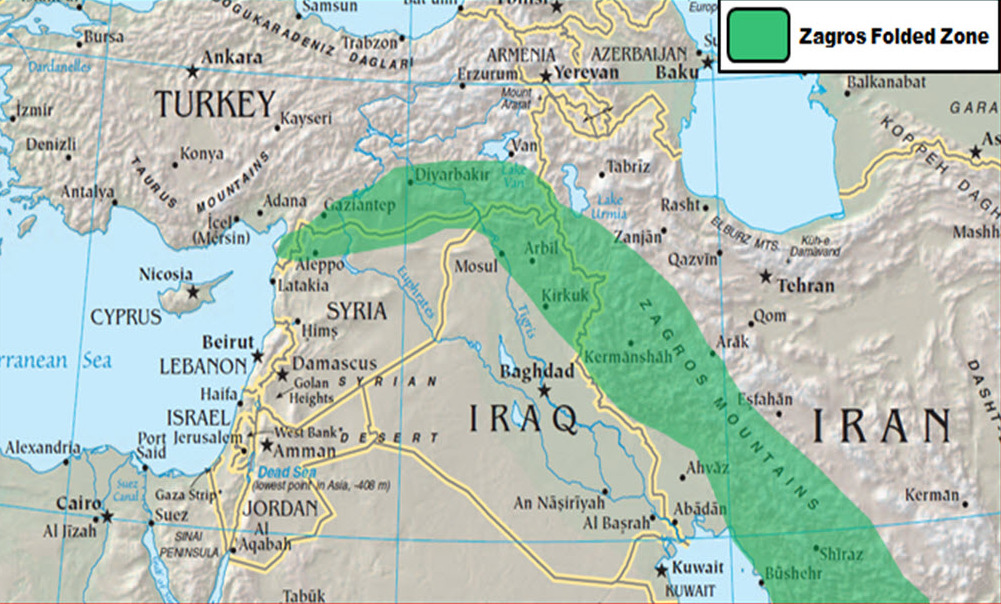

=== Sanandaj–Sirjan ===
This zone is located to the south-southwest of Central Iran and the northeastern edge of Zagros range. In the north and northeast, this zone is separated from Central Iran by depressions like Lake Urmia, Gavkhouni and faults like Shahr-e-Babak and Abadeh, and to the south-southwest by the main thrust fault of Zagros. A striking feature of this zone is the presence of immense volumes of magmatic and metamorphic rocks of Paleozoic and Mesozoic eras. As far as the trends, and particularly the folding style is concerned, some researchers consider the Sanandaj–Sirjan Zone as being similar to Zagros; however, considerable differences exist in rock types, magmatism, metamorphism, and orogenic events. There are some similarities between Sanandaj–Sirjan and Central Iran.

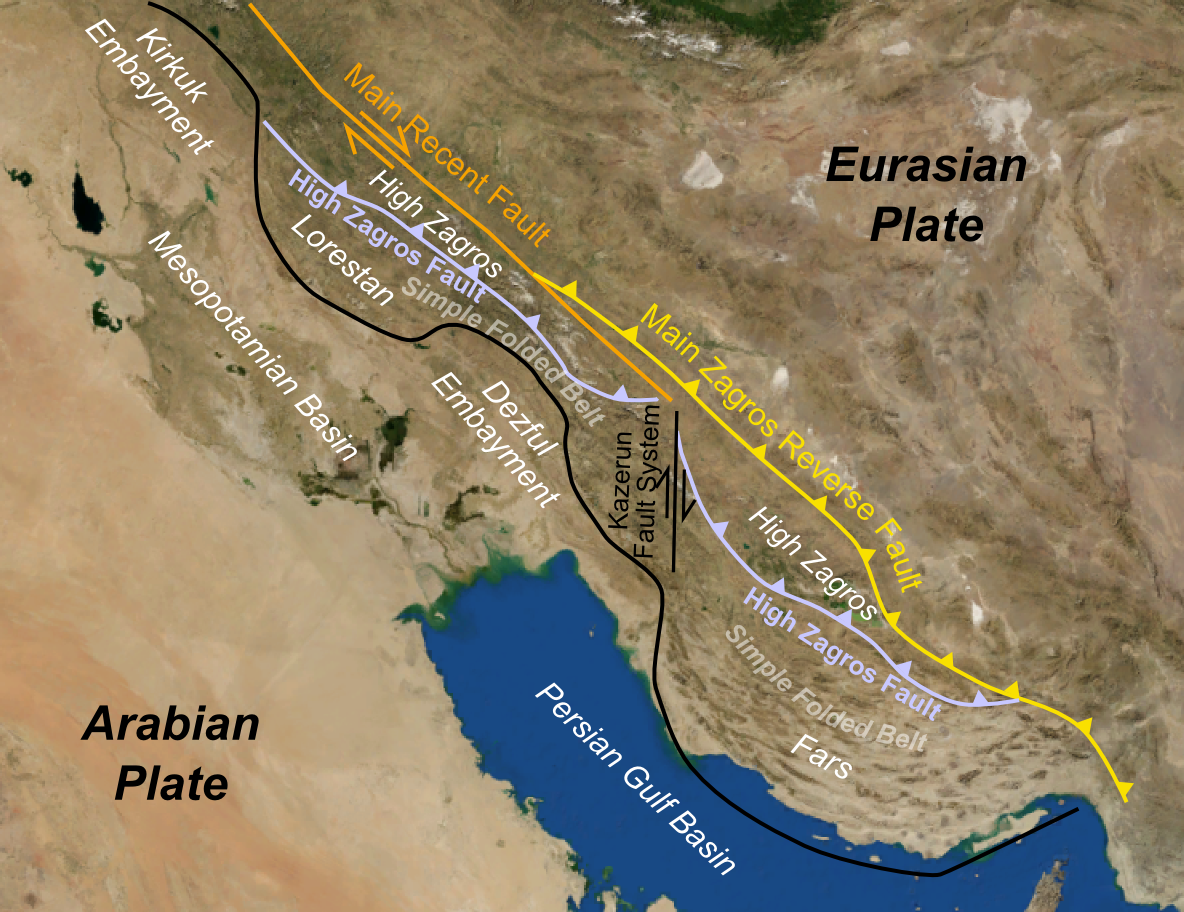
ZagrosFTB

=== Sahand–Bazman volcanic belt ===
This volcanic belt, which is usually called the Central Iranian Range, runs east and almost parallel to the Sanandaj–Sirjan Zone, and owes its existence to the widespread and intensive volcanic activity which developed on the Iranian plate from the Upper Cretaceous to Recent time. The peak of this volcanism happened in the Eocene. The Sahand-Bazman volcanic belt is supposed to have resulted from the collision of the Arabian and Central Iranian continental plate margins. It is represented by sub-alkaline volcanics that vary in composition from basaltic through andesitic to rhyolitic composition.

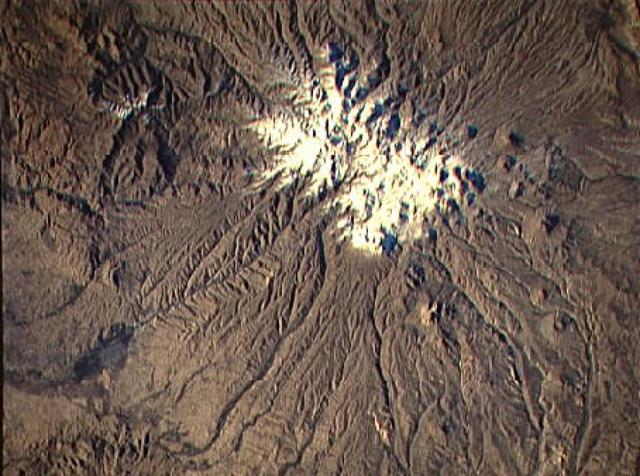
Mount Sahand

=== Central Iran ===
Located in a triangle in the middle of Iran, Central Iran is one of the most important and complicated structural zones in Iran. In this zone, rocks of all ages, from Precambrian to Quaternary, and several episodes of orogeny, metamorphism, and magmatism can be recognized. Central Iran in a broad sense, comprising the whole area between the North and South Iranian ranges. Within the Iranian plate the Central-East Iran microplate is bordered by the Great Kavir Fault in the north, by the Nain–Baft Fault in the west and southwest and by the Harirud Fault in the east. It is surrounded by the Upper Cretaceous to Lower Eocene ophiolite and ophiolitic melange. The microplate consists of different structural components; Kerman-Tabas Block, Yazd Block and Anarak-Khur Block.

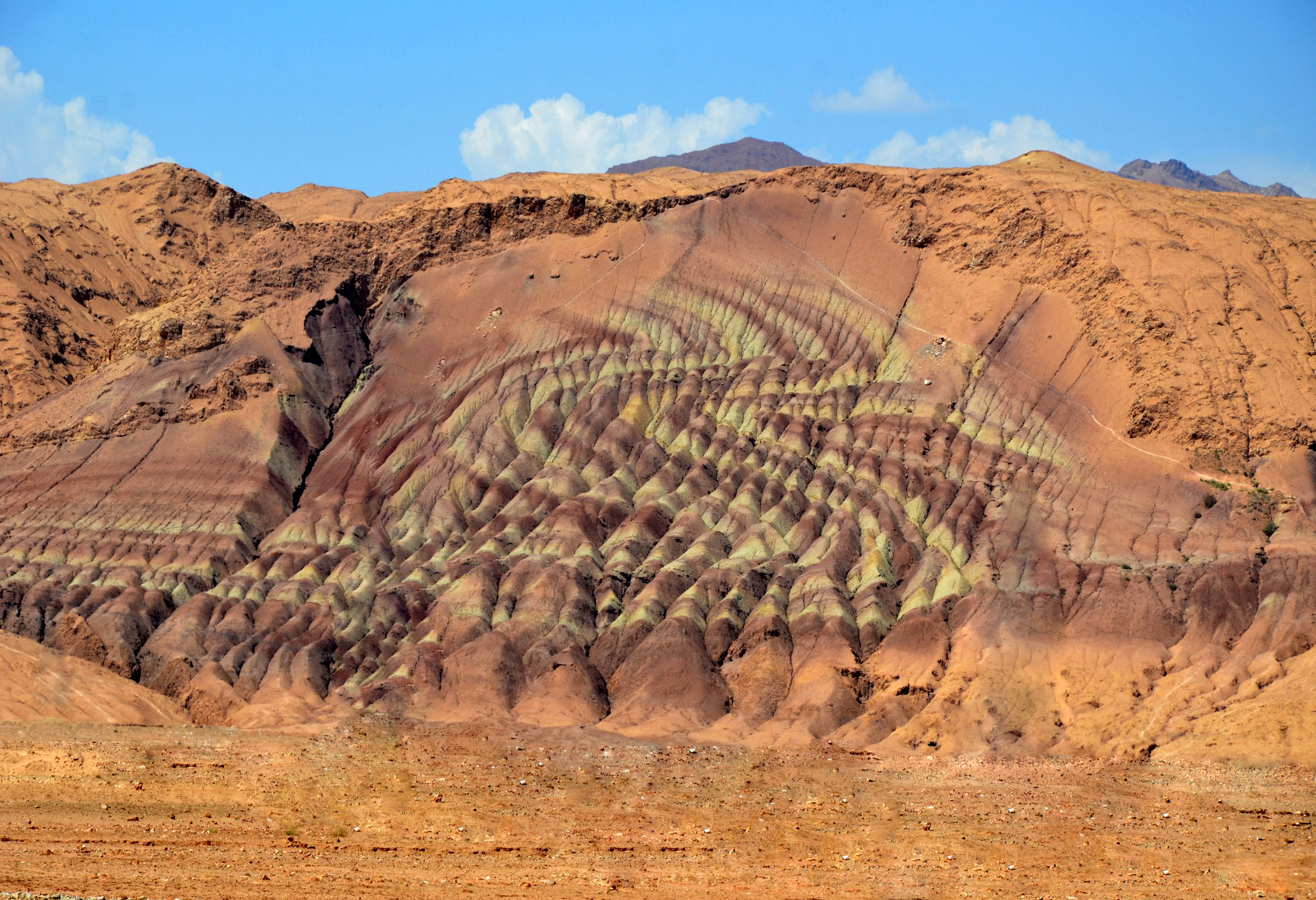

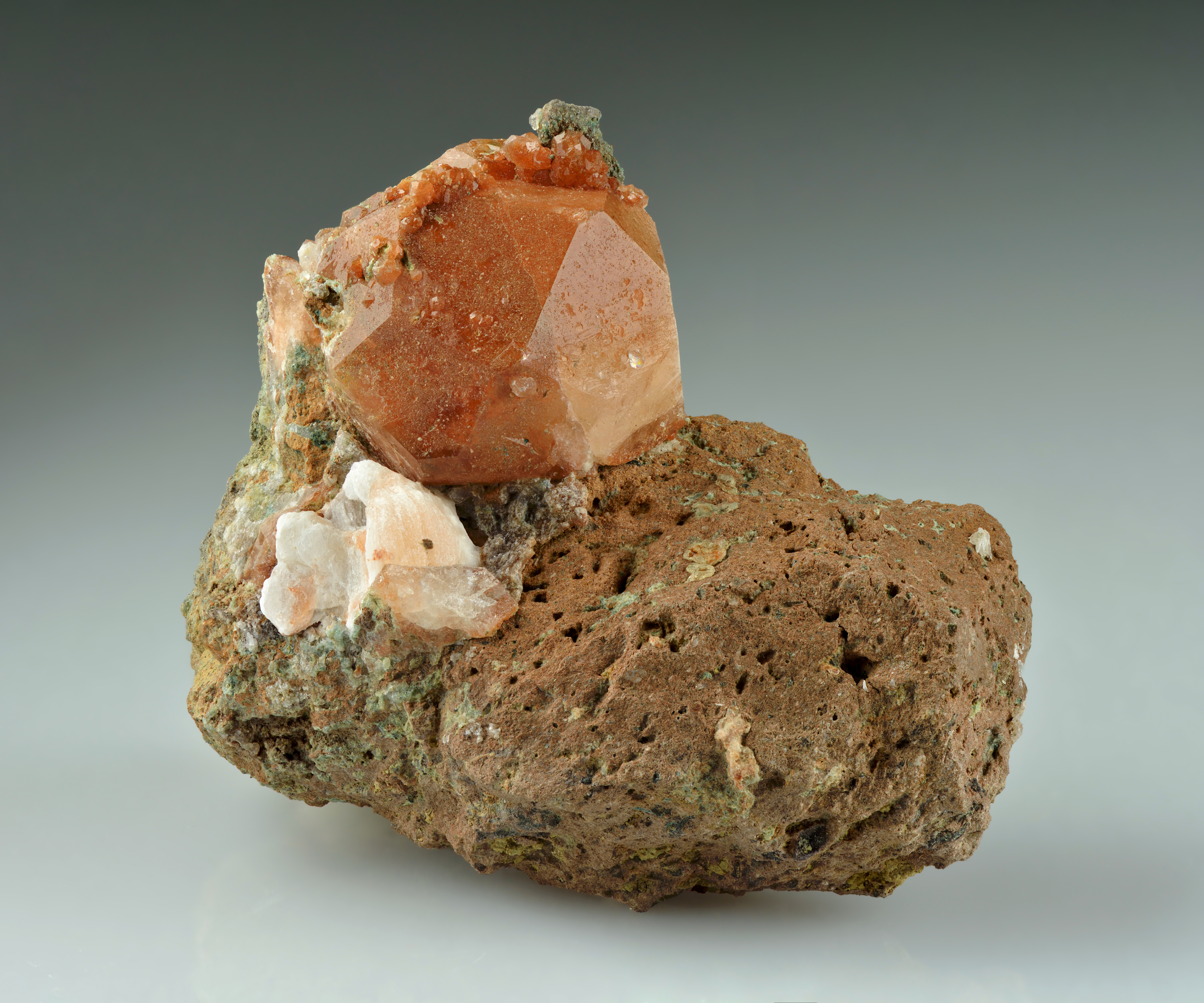

=== Eastern Iran ===
Eastern Iran can be divided into two parts: Lut Block and Flysch Zone (flysch or coloured melange of Zabol–Baluch Zone). Located to the west of Zabol–Baluch Zone, Lut Block is the main body of Eastern Iran. Lut Block extends for about 900 kilometres (560 mi) in a north–south direction. It is bounded in the north by Dorooneh fault and in the south by Jazmurian depression. In the east, it is separated from Flysch Zone by the Nehbandan Fault, whereas the western boundary with Central Iran is Nayband fault and Shotori Mountains. The oldest units include upper Precambrian Lower Cambrian schists overlain by Permian limestone and other Paleozoic sedimentary rocks. Flysch Zone (Zabol–Baluch) is located between Lut Block to the west and Helmand (in Afghanistan) to the east. In contrast to Lut Block, the Flysch Zone is highly deformed and tectonized and consists of thick deep-sea sediments like argillaceous and silicic shales, radiolarite, and pelagic limestone and volcanic rocks such as basalt, spilitic basalt, diabase, andesite, dacite, rhyolite, and subordinate serpentinized ultramafic rocks. The basement is likely composed of an oceanic crust. Most rock units in this zone fall into three main groups: flyschoid sediments; volcanic, volcanosedimentary, and intrusive rocks; and ophiolitic series.

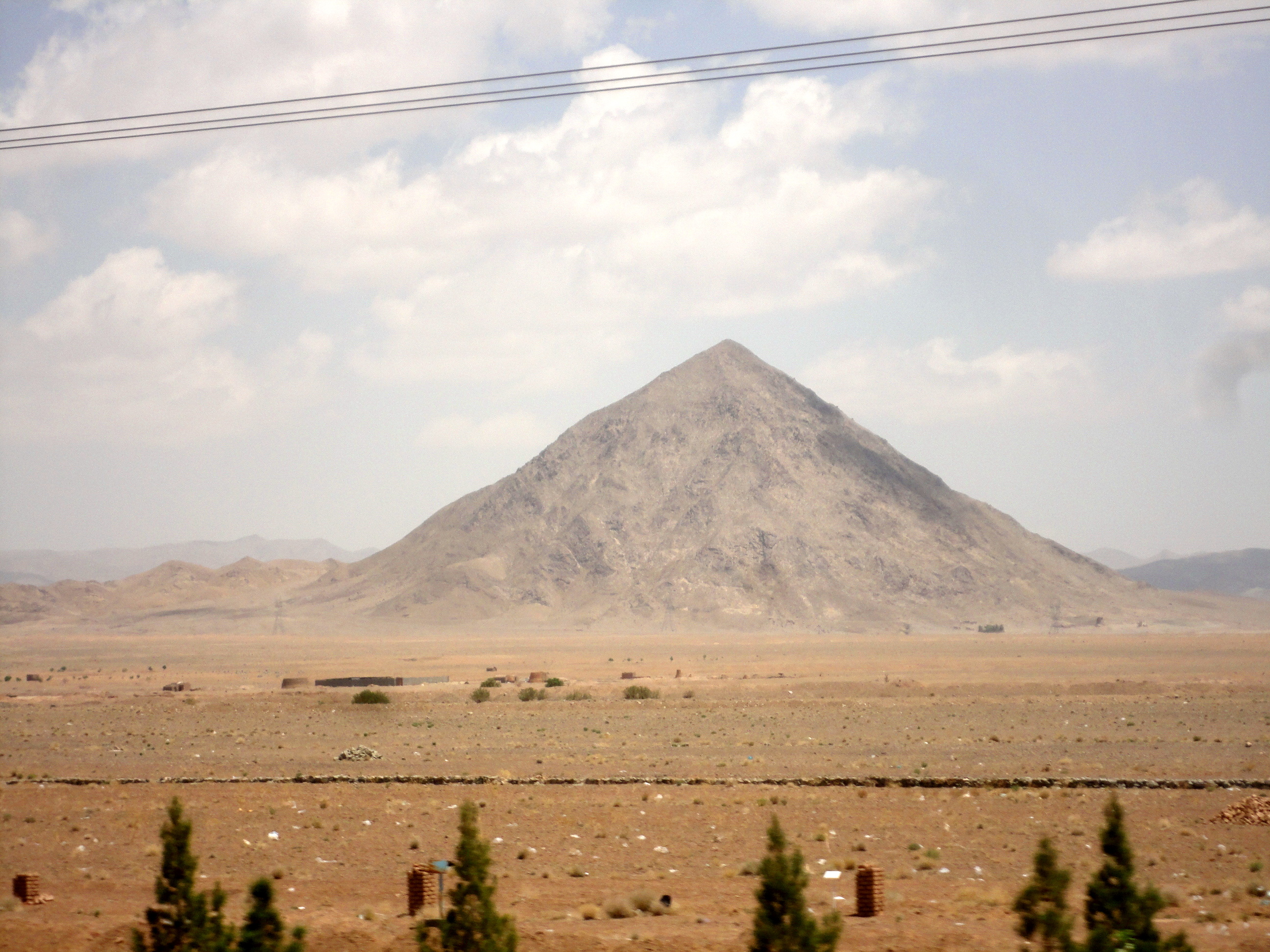

=== Southeastern Iran or Makran ===
Southeastern Iran or Makran zone is located to the south of Jazmurian depression. Its western boundary is Minab Fault; to the south, it is restricted by the Gulf of Oman, and to the east, it extends into Pakistan. The northern part is characterized by dominance of east–west trending faults, Bashagard fault being the most important one. Along these faults lies large section of ophiolite series. The oldest rocks in this zone are the ophiolites of Late Cretaceous–Paleocene overlain by a thick sequence (about 5,000 m) of sandstone, shale, and marl. The whole sequence is deformed prior to Early Miocene. Thick sequence of Neogene rock units, in excess of 5,000 m, covers the older series.

=== Kopeh Dagh ===
The northeastern active fold belt of Iran, the Kopeh Dagh, is formed on the Hercynian metamorphosed basement at the southwestern margin of the Turan Platform. The belt is composed of about 10 kilometres of Mesozoic and Tertiary sediments (mostly carbonates) and, like the Zagros, was folded into long linear northwest–southeast trending folds during the last phase of the Alpine Orogeny, in the Miocene and Plio-Pleistocene time. No magmatic rocks are exposed in Kopeh Dagh except for those in the basement in the Aghdarband and some Triassic basic dikes. This basin was located in the northeastern Iran. From Middle Jurassic, it was covered with a vast continental shelf sea. In this period of time and due to transgression as well as rapid subsidence basin, the western part became deeper. In this basin, a thick sequence of continuous marine and continental sediments was deposited (about 10 km). No major sedimentary gap or volcanic activities during Jurassic to Miocene have ever been reported.

This sedimentary complex provides suitable conditions for accumulation of hydrocarbons. Kopeh Dagh sedimentary rocks were placed in their current position due to uplifting at the end of the Miocene. The Kopeh Dagh Range, itself, is made chiefly of Cretaceous rocks with a smaller portion of Jurassic rocks in the southeastern parts. The mountains were mainly formed in the Miocene during the Alpine orogeny. As the Tethys Sea was closed and the Arabian plate collided with the Iranian plate and was pushed against it, and with the clockwise rotation of the Eurasian plate towards the Iranian plate and their final collision, the Iranian plate was pressed against the Turan Platform. This collision folded the entire rocks that had been deposited in this geosyncline or basin from the Jurassic to the Miocene and formed the Kopeh Dagh Mountains.

=== Alborz ===
The Alborz mountain range forms a barrier between the south Caspian and the Iranian plateau. This range is located in northern Iran, parallel to the southern margin of Caspian Sea. Alborz is characterized by the dominance of platform-type sediments, including limestone, dolomite, and clastic rocks. Rock units from Precambrian to Quaternary have been identified, with some hiatuses and unconformities in Paleozoic and Mesozoic. Unlike its northern and southern boundaries, (Caspian Sea and Central Iran, respectively) there is not a consensus regarding the eastern and the western limits of Alborz. The Binalud Mountains in the east, although the continuation of the Alborz, bear features comparable to those of Central Iran. The Alborz mountain range is only 60–130 km wide and consists of sedimentary series dating from Upper Devonian to Oligocene, prevalently Jurassic limestone over a granite core. Continental conditions regarding sedimentation are reflected by thick Devonian sandstones and by Jurassic shales containing coal seams. Marine conditions are reflected by Carboniferous and Permian strata that are composed mainly of limestones.

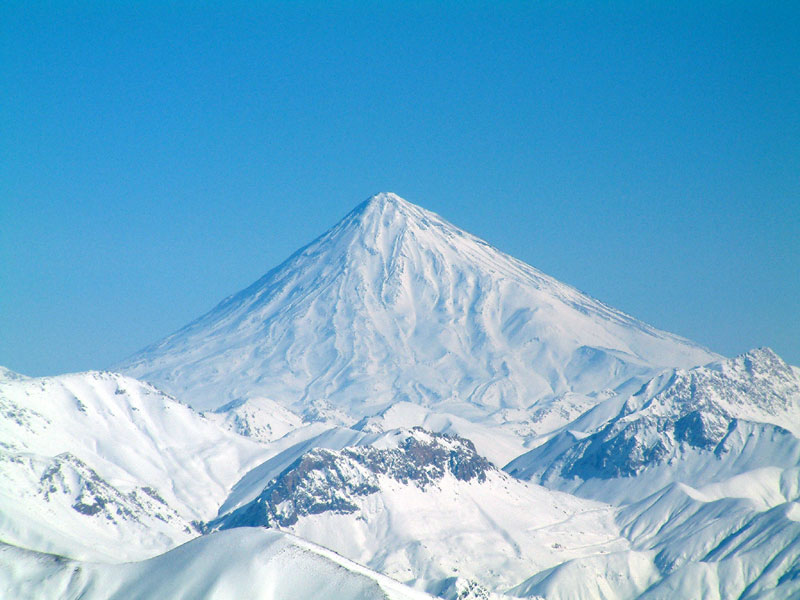
Mount Damavand

In the Eastern Alborz Range, the far eastern section is formed by the Mesozoic (chiefly Triassic and Jurassic) rocks, while the western part of the Eastern Alborz Range is made primarily of the Paleozoic rocks. The Precambrian rocks can be found chiefly south of the city of Gorgan situated in the southeast of the Caspian Sea and in much smaller portions in the central and western parts of the Central Alborz Range. The central part of the Central Alborz Range is formed predominantly of the Triassic and Jurassic rocks, while the northwestern section of the range is made chiefly of Jurassic rocks. Very thick beds of the Tertiary (mostly of the Eocene) green volcanic tuffs and lavas are found mainly in the southwestern and south-central parts of the range. The far northwestern part of the Alborz that constitutes what is called the Western Alborz Range or the Talish Mountains is made mainly of the Upper Cretaceous volcano-sedimentary deposits with a strip of Paleozoic rocks and a band of Triassic and Jurassic rocks in the southern parts, both in a northwest–southeast direction. With the northward movement of Africa and the Arabian plate and with the closure of the Tethys Sea as the Arabian plate collided with the Iranian plate and was pushed against it, and with the clockwise movement of the Eurasian plate towards the Iranian plate and their final collision, the Iranian plate was pressed from both sides. The collisions finally caused the folding of the Upper Paleozoic, Mesozoic, and Paleogene rocks, and the Cenozoic (chiefly the Eocene) volcanism to form the Alborz Mountains mainly in the Miocene. The Alpine orogeny began, therefore, with Eocene volcanism in southwestern and south-central parts of the Alborz and continued with the uplift and folding of the older sedimentary rocks in the northwestern, central and eastern parts of the range during the orogenic phases of importance that date from the Miocene and the Pliocene epochs.

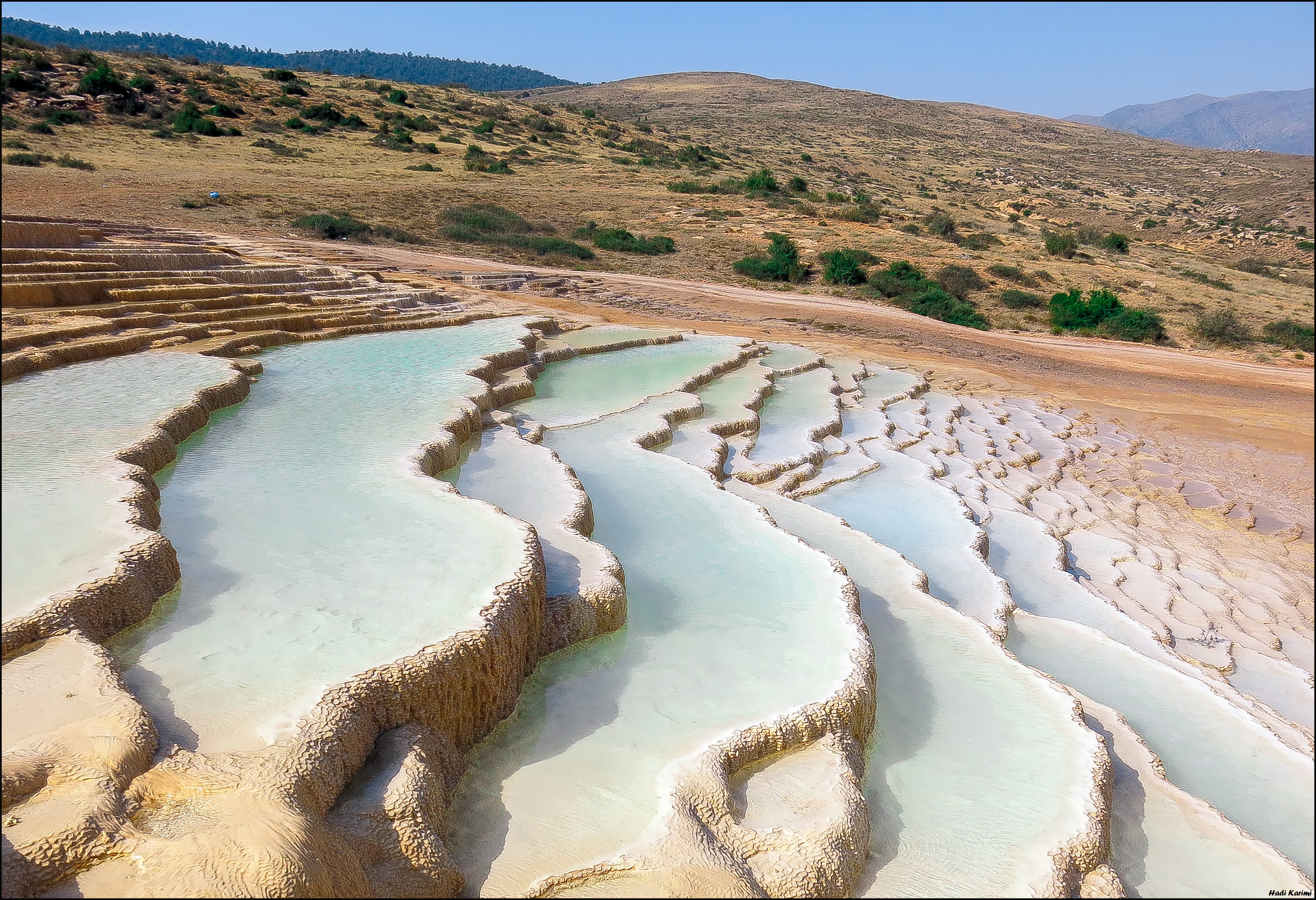

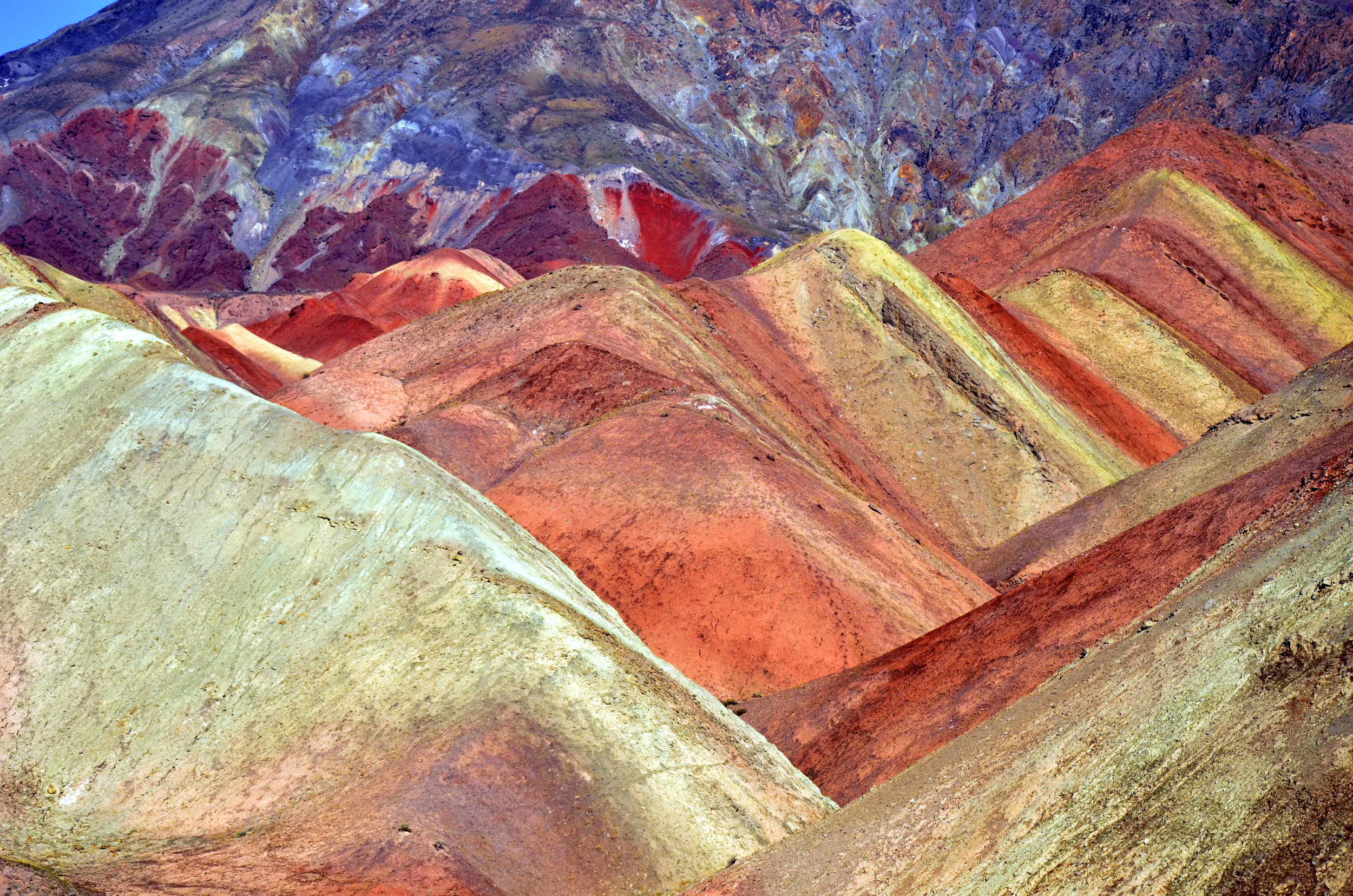

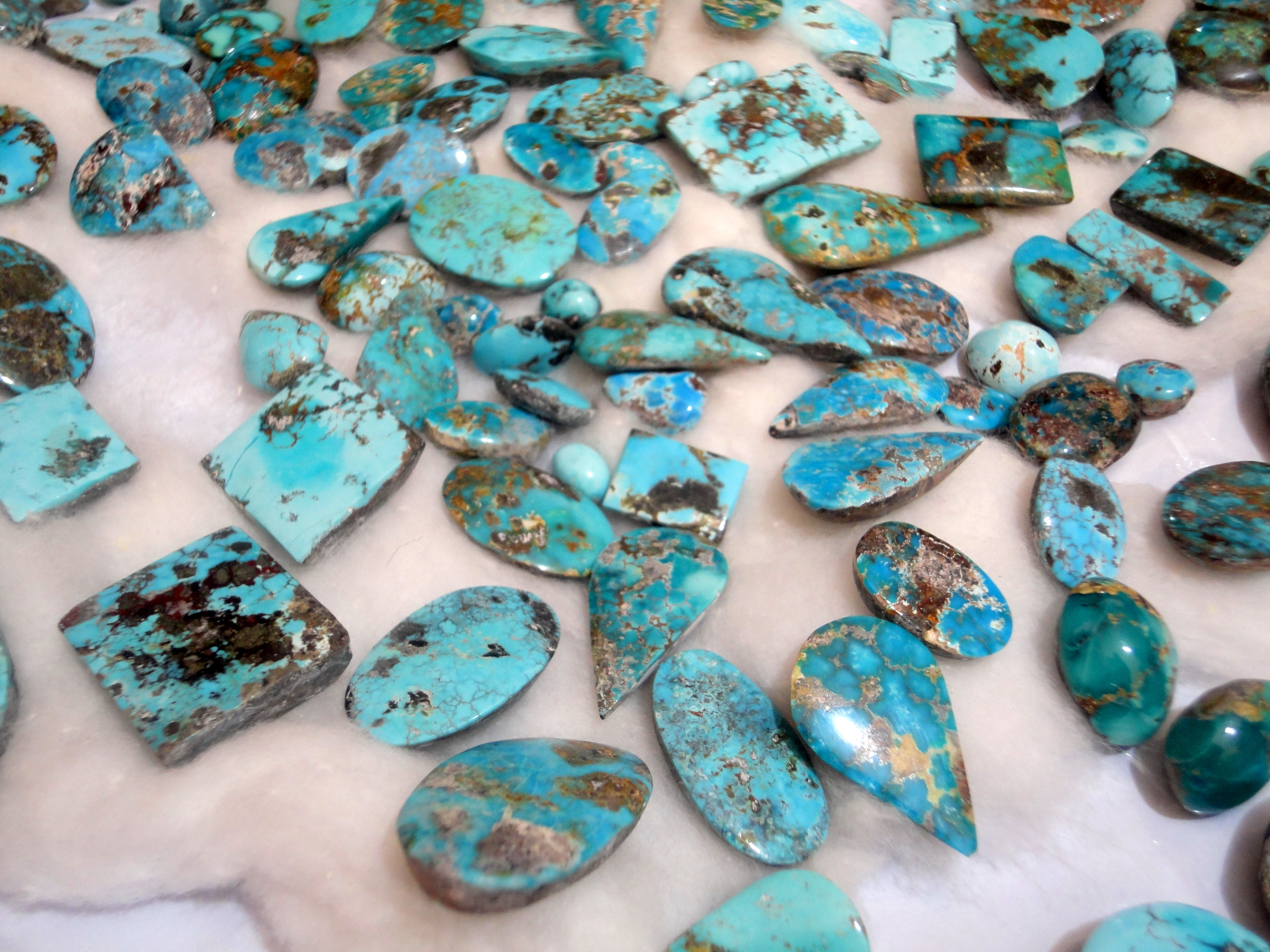

=== Azerbaijan ===
There is no agreement regarding the geological setting of Azerbaijan. According to some authors, the northeastern corner could be included in Alborz and the southeastern part in Sanandaj–Sirjan. Some believe that most of Azerbaijan lies in a zone called Azerbaijan–Alborz, and as they indicate, this zone is bounded in the north by Alborz Fault, in the west by Tabriz–Urumiyeh Fault, and in the south by Semnan Fault. According to the some authors, the northern part of Azerbaijan continues to the Caucasus Mountains in Caucasia and the Pontus Mountains in Turkey and the Southern Azerbaijan is comparable with Central Iran and Western Iran and extends to the Taurus Mountains in Turkey. The significant structural event occurring in Early Devonian was accompanied by faulting and fragmentation that led to a different sedimentary facies in Azerbaijan. This orogenic episode generated the Tabriz fault, extending in a northwest–southeast direction from Zanjan depression to the northern mountains of Tabriz (Mishu, Morou) and northwest of Azerbaijan and the Caucasus. This event divided Azerbaijan into two blocks, one block in the northeast with subsidence and sedimentation in Early Devonian and the other in the southwest which remained high until Late Carboniferous.

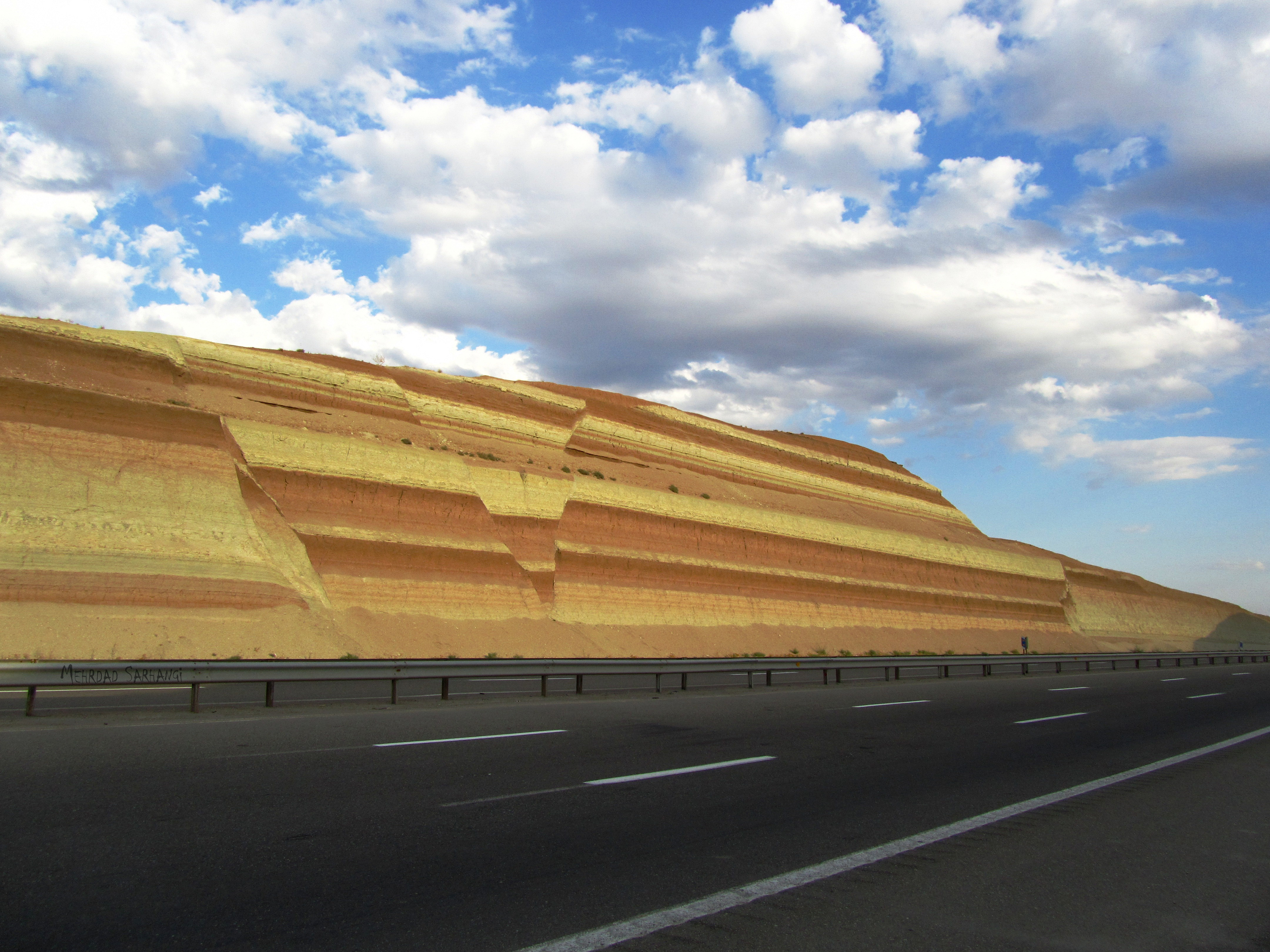
Geo-tourism landscape Azerbaijani panoramio

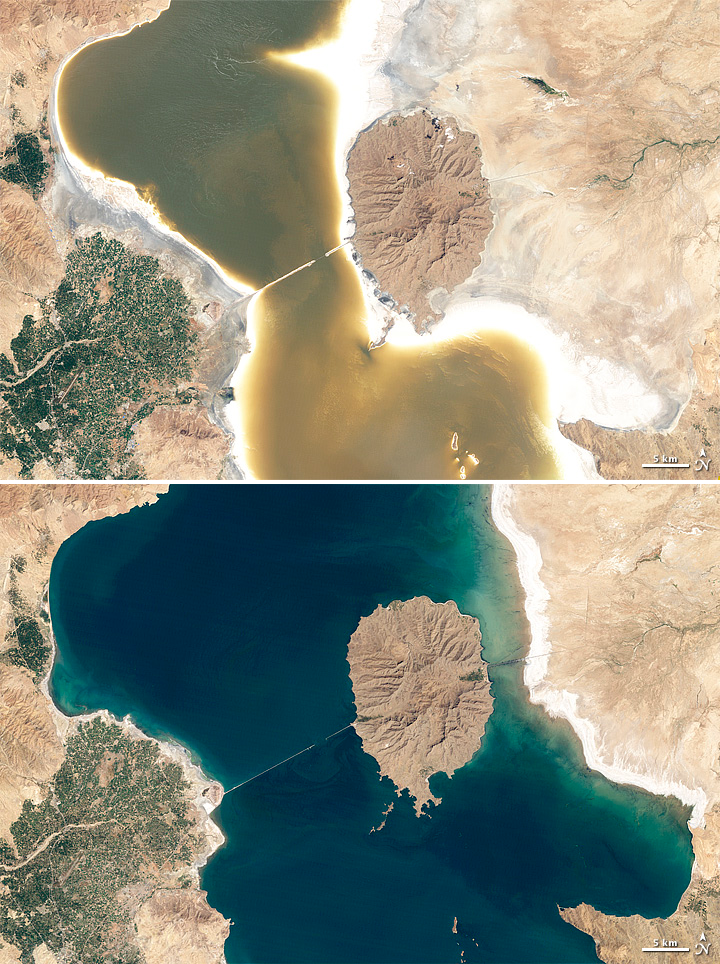
Lake Orumiyeh Iran

== Stratigraphy of Iran ==
=== Precambrian ===
The consolidation of the Iranian basement by metamorphism, partial granitization and partly by intense folding took place in the Late Precambrian. This event has been attributed to the 'Baikalian' or Pan-African orogeny by various authors. Isotopic data of Iranian basement rocks give ages between 600 and 900 Ma. A similar range of isotopic data had been obtained for Arabian-Nubian Shield rocks. An important post-Pan-African magmatism is documented by the widespread Doran Granite, which cuts the Upper Precambrian rocks and is covered by Lower Cambrian sediments. Late Precambrian postorogenic volcanics, mainly alkali rhyolite, rhyolite tuff and basic dikes are known in the Eocambrian formations. In North and Central Iran, Kahar and Gharehdash Formations and the lower half of the Soltanieh Formation are of Precambrian age. The oldest rocks in Iran belong to the Kushk Series consisting of clastic sediments, acidic volcanic, tuff, and carbonates (mainly dolomite). Other formations of Late Precambrian–Early Cambrian ages include Rizu volcanic-sedimentary formation, Dezu and Tashk Formations, Aghda Limestone, Kalmard Series, Shorm Beds, and Anarak metamorphic units. The sedimentary facies of Precambrian–Lower Cambrian rocks in Northern Iran is different from that of Central Iran.

=== Paleozoic ===
With the Pan-African orogeny and following this orogenic episode, shallow marine sediments formed in Late Vendian. The influence of the orogenic episode is evident at the base of the Vendian sediments. Deposition of shallow marine sediments covered large areas in Iran during Paleozoic (e.g., Alborz, East of Iran, Zagros). There is strong stratigraphic evidence that transition from Vendian to Lower Cambrian was a progressive one, without hiatuses; there is no evidence for any orogenic or epeirogenic movements in Iran at this time (e.g., south of Zanjan, Valiabad Chalus, Shahin Dezh). Early Cambrian started with an alternation of shale, phosphate-bearing limestone, and dolomite sitting conformably and transitionally over Vendian dolomites. Transition from Soltanieh Formation to Barut, Zaigoon, and Laloon Formations is very difficult to recognize in the field. Middle Cambrian is characterized by uplift and regression; however, a renewed progression at this time led to the deposition of Mila and Kuhbonan Formations, consisting of limestone, dolomite, and shale, over older units. These formations bear trilobites and brachiopods of Middle and Late Cambrian age. In some areas, the Late Cambrian carbonate facies turns transitionally into Ordovician graptolite shales, known as the Lashkarak Formation in Alborz, Shirgasht Formation in Central Iran and Ilbeyk and Zardkuh Formations in Zagros.

In Kalmard area, Ordovician sediments are sitting on the Vendian sediments through an angular unconformity. In the Late Ordovician, most parts of Iran were affected by epeirogenic movements; this coincides with Caledonian orogeny in Europe and some other parts of the earth. The epeirogeny caused a distinct hiatus at the Ordovician–Silurian boundary. Where present, the Silurian rocks in Iran consist mainly of limestone, sandstone, shale and volcanic materials, known as Niur Formation in Central Iran. The Lower Devonian rocks have been reported from several localities in Central Iran (e.g., Tabas, Sourian, Kerman, Zagros); however, they seem to be missing in Alborz and parts of Zagros. Upper Devonian is characterized by marine transgression, particularly in Alborz, that extends into Lower Carboniferous. With exception of Tabas area, no record of Middle Carboniferous marine deposits has yet been discovered in Iran. Upper Carboniferous deposits are not significantly present in Iran and have only been identified in several localities from index goniatites. After a general regression and a distinct hiatus in Upper Carboniferous, Permian marine transgression deposits cover most parts of Iran (e.g., Alborz, Zagros, Central Iran); The Permian sediments are represented by Dorood Sandstones, Ruteh and Nesen Limestones in Alborz.

=== Mesozoic ===
The Lower Triassic sediments in Iran are mainly of shallow marine or continental shelf nature (e.g., Doroud sandstones and Elika dolomites in Alborz, Sorkh shales and Shotori dolomites in Central Iran. A continuous Permian–Triassic sequence has been reported from several areas in Iran, including Jolfa (northwest of Iran), Abadeh (Southern Central Iran), and Southern Urumiyeh (the continuation of the Taurus in Turkey), north of Kandovan and Southern Amol. Transition from Middle to Upper Triassic coincides with Early Cimmerian orogenic episode, which led to the segmentation of the sedimentary basin into three sub-basins: Zagros in the south and southwest, Alborz in the north, and Central Iran. The Lower Jurassic rocks conformably overlie the Upper Triassic units; so are the Early Cretaceous deposits over the Upper Jurassic strata (e.g., Zagros). In North and Central Iran, the Upper Triassic and Lower–Middle Jurassic sediments have a detrital nature, consisting mainly of shale and sandstone with thicknesses varying from a few meters to more than 3,000 metres (9,800 ft). The presence of plant remains and coal beds suggest a continental or lagoon environment for the deposits. The Cretaceous deposits, characterized by diverse sedimentary facies, are widespread all over Iran. In Late Cretaceous, tectonic movements related to the Laramide orogeny affects most parts of Iran, leading to uplift, folding, and faulting. This is a prelude to significant developments in the geological evolution of Iran.

=== Cenozoic ===
In Iran the Cenozoic begins with the Cretaceous–Paleocene boundary that is characterized by striking changes in sedimentary environments (e.g., Alborz, Central Iran). An unconformity has been reported from many locations in Iran. Both continuous and discontinuous transitions have been discovered between Paleocene and Eocene strata; as is the case with Eocene and Oligocene (e.g., Central Iran). The Oligocene and Miocene stages are characterized by rapid subsidence, deposition, and facies changes in both marine and continental sedimentary basins (e.g., Mahneshan and Halab south of Zanjan). Oligocene sediments in most parts of Iran are of shallow marine character, turning into marine facies in Upper Oligocene through Lower Miocene (e.g., Qom). The Middle to Upper Miocene sediments are mostly of continental nature. The Quaternary is the prominent feature of the plains of Iran.

== Magmatism and igneous rocks ==
Magmatic rocks of all ages, from the Precambrian to the Quaternary, are widespread in Iran (e.g., Doran Granite, Zarigan–Narigan Granite, Torghabeh Granite, Ghaen Granite, Chaghand Gabbro, Alvand Granite and Natanz Granite). A correlation exists between distribution of magmatic rocks and certain types of ore deposits (e.g., iron deposits in Bafq related to Zarigan–Narigan-type granites, Mazraeh copper deposits related to Sheyvar–Daghi Granite, Sarcheshmeh porphyry deposit related to Sarcheshmeh porphyry body). Several episodes of magmatic activity have been identified in Iran. These episodes could be described as:

=== Upper Precambrian–Lower Cambrian ===
Volcanic and plutonic rocks with an age of 630–530 million years have been reported from many localities in Iran, particularly in Central Iran and Azerbaijan. These magmatic rocks seem to be related to the Pan-African tectonic-magmatic episode. Most magmatic rocks of this time bear an alkaline nature. The following magmatic series can be attributed to this phase: Doran-type intrusions in Azerbaijan. Narigan and Zarigan-type intrusive bodies extend from Anarak to Bafq and Kuhbonan. Volcanic rocks, mostly of rhyolite composition, in Ghareh Dash, Azerbaijan. Volcanic rocks associated with Kushk Series in the Bafq area. Volcanic rocks of Rizu, Dezu, and Kushk Formations in Central Iran. Most Precambrian metamorphic rocks of greenschist or even amphibolite facies, such as in Takab and Anarak areas, seem to have originally been volcanic materials, either lava or pyroclastic rocks.

=== Lower Paleozoic ===
Magmatic rocks of this time have been reported from many areas in Iran. Examples include basaltic rocks of Shahrud and Khosh Yeilagh, andesitic-basaltic units of Niur Formation in Central Iran, and tuffaceous materials in the upper parts of Mila Formation in Eastern Iran.

=== Upper Paleozoic ===
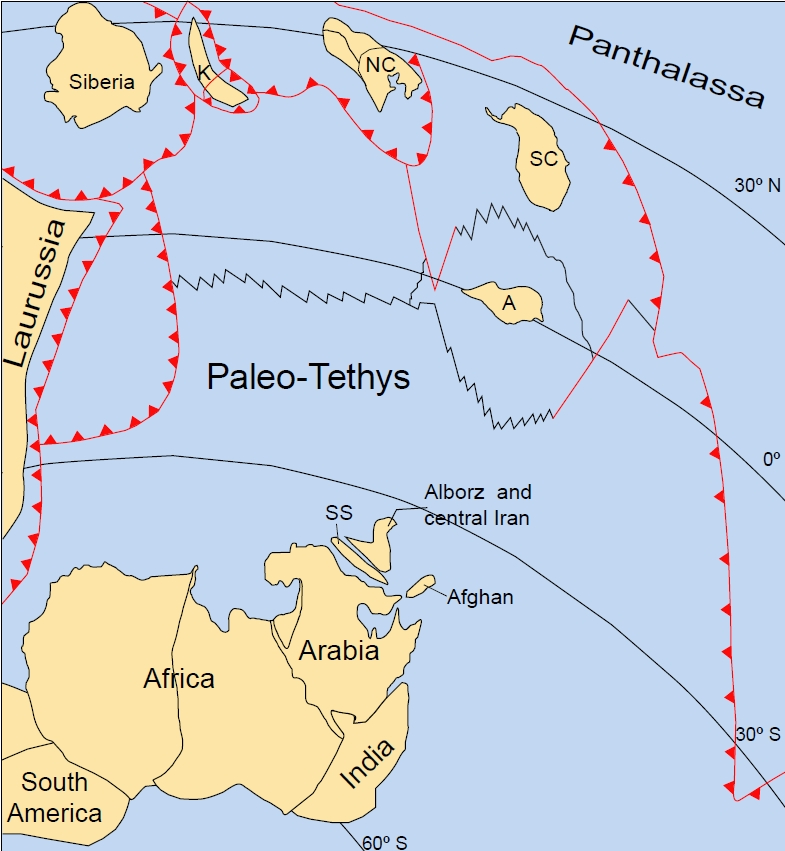
Early Carboniferous paleogeography (about 350 Ma) with the Paleo-Tethys indicated

Volcanic rocks of andesitic-basaltic composition accompany Upper Paleozoic sedimentary strata in many areas all over Iran. Basaltic rocks associated with Jeyrud Formation of Upper Devonian are a typical example. There is strong evidence for significant magmatic activities in Late Paleozoic–Early Mesozoic (Early Permian to Early Jurassic) in Iran. Examples include: magmatic rocks in the Southern Sanandaj–Sirjan (granites and gabbros of Sirjan area) and volcanic rocks of Songhor Series in Northern Sanandaj–Sirjan. Ultramafic and mafic rocks and their metamorphosed equivalents could be observed in Eastern Iran (Fariman area), Taknar Series, Gorgan schists, and Shanderman mafic/ultramafic metamorphic series.

=== Mesozoic ===
The Mesozoic magmatic rocks are associated with Cimmerian and Laramide orogenic events that caused continental and oceanic rifting, followed by closures and collisions in vast areas of Iran (e.g., Sanandaj–Sirjan). The Mesozoic magmatic rocks can be divided into three groups: Volcanic rocks: These rocks occurred mainly as a result of extension or tension related to the continental rifting, or subduction of the developed oceanic lithosphere under the continental lithosphere (e.g., Central Alborz for continental rifting; Saghez-Sanandaj axis for subduction). Intrusive rocks: Many intrusive bodies of mafic to granitic composition, with ages varying from early Triassic to Late Cretaceous, have been identified in Iran (e.g., Borujerd–Shamsabad axis). In Triassic–Jurassic, volcanic rocks predominated the plutonic rocks. They are mainly alkaline in nature and are more abundant in Sanandaj–Sirjan. In Jurassic–Cretaceous, intrusive rocks exceed volcanic rocks; a significant number of batholiths in Iran occurred at this time. Kolah Ghazi, Shir Kuh, and Shah Kuh were formed by Jurassic granite; and Mount Alvand was made by Upper Cretaceous-Paleocene granite.

=== Cenozoic ===
The Tertiary is of great concern in Iran because of the great volumes and highly diverse types of igneous rocks and associated mineral deposits. Magmatic rocks of this age are widespread all over Iran, except in the Zagros and Kopet Dagh. Data from various structural zones indicate that the volcanic and plutonic activities started in the Late Cretaceous, peaked in the Eocene, and continued, with short stops, into the Quaternary. Some of the more important regions in terms of the Tertiary magmatic activities include: Sahand-Bazman (or Urumiyeh-Dokhtar) volcanic-plutonic belt with a series of famous mountain ranges including the Karkas Mountains and Jebal Barez and important peaks such as Karkas, Marshenan, Hezar and Lalehzar. The Tertiary magmatism could also be observed in Azerbaijan, Tarom–Taleghan, Central Alborz and its southern margins, Kavir–Sabzevar, Kashmar–Torbat-e Jam, Lut and Kavir, Central Iran, Sistan, Bam, Bazman, Taftan, East Iran, and Southern Jazmurian–Sabzevaran. The Quaternary volcanism produced very high peaks such as Sahand, Sabalan, Damavand, Taftan, Bazman and many others.

== Ophiolite series and ultramafic rocks ==
Ophiolite series and ultramafic rocks have a widespread occurrence in Iran and can be grouped as follows: Ultramafic and mafic units of Late Precambrian–Early Cambrian. Although comparable to modern ophiolites, these rocks do not display all typical features of an oceanic crust. The term “old ophiolite” might be a misnomer. These rocks are widespread in Takab and Anarak Regions. They might be representing a protorift. Ultramafic and mafic rocks of Upper Paleozoic occur as metamorphosed as well as non-metamorphosed bodies in some areas like Fariman, Shanderman, and Asalem. These rocks display many typical features of modern ophiolites. Ophiolite series of Early Cretaceous–Paleogene age show typical features of ophiolitic sequences and are thought to be associated with the closure of the Neotethys. These ophiolite series are widespread in Iran. Some of the more important locations include Kermanshah–Neyriz–Oman Belt, Makran (south of Jazmurian), ultramafic–mafic rocks related to Flysch Zone in Khash–Nosrat Abad–Birjand Belt, ultramafic and mafic rocks north of Dorooneh fault, Torbat-e Jam–Torbat-e Heydarieh–Sabzevar–Fariman regions, and Central Iran–Nain–Baft–Shahr-e Babak, Khoy–Maku. Ultramafic and mafic rocks also occur in association with large gabbroic intrusions. This type probably resulted from differentiation in a large mafic magma chamber, comparable to those of the layered mafic intrusions. Examples occur in Sero, Urumiyeh, and in Masooleh that are Late Cretaceous to Lower Oligocene in age. The most remarkable occurrence of ophiolite could be observed in the Bashagard Mountains in the southeast and the Jaghatai Mountains in the northeast of Iran.

== Orogenic events in Iran ==
=== Pan-African ===
The Pan-African orogeny is equivalent to Asynitic in other parts of the earth. This event was associated with metamorphism, magmatism, folding, and faulting during Late Precambrian–Early Cambrian in Iran (e.g., south of Zanjan–Mahabad in Azerbaijan, Bafq in Central Iran. This tectonic phase started with tension or extension leading to the formation of rifts and generation of oceanic crust (e.g., in Takab and Anarak) and ended with folding, closure, metamorphism, growth of the continental crust, and development of regional faults.

=== Caledonian ===
There was no considerable folding or faulting related to this event in Iran. The Caledonian orogeny in Iran is characterized by facies change in sedimentary basins, hiatuses, and epeirogenic movements (e.g., parts of Alborz, Zagros, and Central Iran). This phase, starting from Late Cambrian, caused the marine facies of Barut and Zaigoon Formations to change into the continental facies of Lalun Formation, and continued on to Late Devonian.

=== Hercynian ===
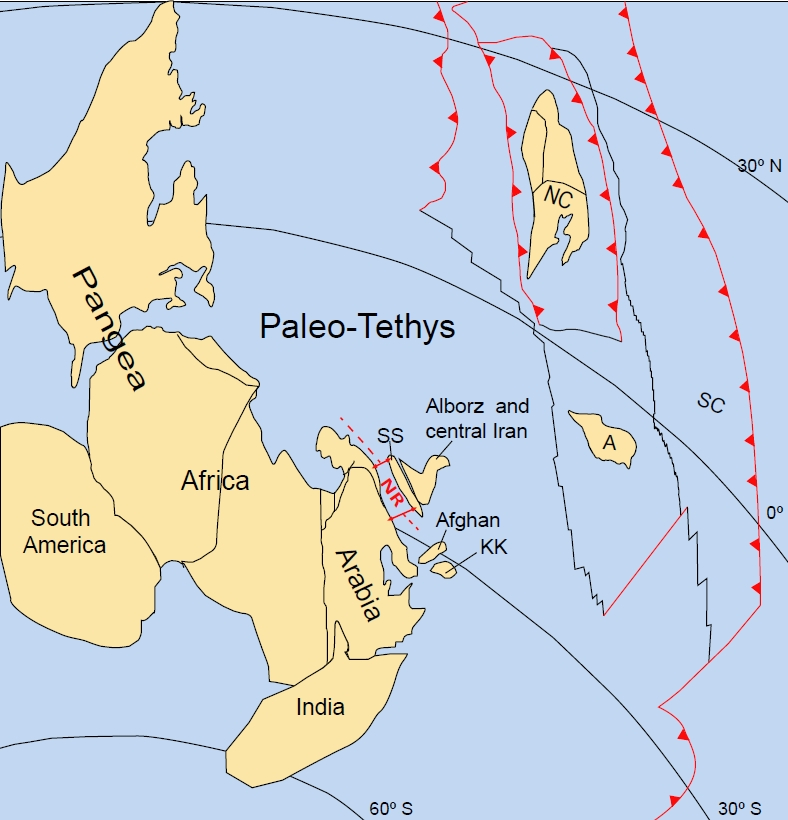
Late Carboniferous paleogeography (about 320 Ma) with the Paleo-Tethys indicated

The effects of this orogenic episode in Iran can be traced from the Late Devonian. Due to the scarcity of magmatism, metamorphism, and folding related to this episode, the role of the Hercynian orogeny in Iran is controversial; the Hercynian in Iran is largely represented by extensional rather than compressional tectonics (e.g., Sanandaj–Sirjan). Iranian microplates east and northeast of the Zagros were detached from Gondwana in the Carboniferous during this orogenic phase.

The Neo-Tethys opening and rifting of Iran from the northern margin of Gondwana has probably occurred sometime between the latest Viséan to early Late Carboniferous (Bashkirian). Evidence for this conclusion are:

1. the northern Paleo-Tethyan affinity of the foraminiferal associations in the late Viséan-late Serpukhovian in Alborz
2. the unique similarity between the Bashkirian-Kasimovian and late Gzhelian fusulinid assemblages of Iran to the northern margin of the Paleo-Tethys
3. the Carboniferous magmatic activities in northwestern Iran and normal faulting and tilted blocks in the High Zagros Belt which, taken together, support extensional deformation related to the Variscan or Hercynian orogeny.

=== Early Cimmerian ===
The Early Cimmerian orogeny is one of the most important tectonic events in the geological history of the earth. Many diverse features are associated with this phase, including metamorphism, magmatism, folding, faulting, creation of new basins, and facies change. This event was associated with compressional tectonics in the northern Iran and tensional tectonics in the south. There is evidence that the compressional phase was preceded by tension and rift development. The compressional phase, happening in the Late Triassic, finally led to the closure of the Paleotethys (e.g., southeast to southwest of Caspian Sea). Iranian microplates that had been detached from Gondwana in the Carboniferous and that had been submerged and had moved northwards toward Laurasia finally collided with the Eurasian section of the northern supercontinent Laurasia in the Late Triassic.

=== Late Cimmerian ===
The Late Cimmerian orogeny occurred as a significant tectonic event in Iran in Late Jurassic–Early Cretaceous times. This event is represented by folding, facies changes in sedimentary environments, angular unconformity, magmatism, and metamorphism (e.g., Alborz, Sanandaj–Sirjan, and Central Iran). The Jurassic granite of Kolah Ghazi, Shir Kuh, and Shah Kuh was made during this orogenic phase.

=== Laramide ===
The Laramide orogeny happened in the Late Cretaceous–Paleocene and played a great role in the geological evolution of Iran. This event started under a compressional regime, followed by an extensional one. The compressional regime, that was associated with significant intrusive magmatic activities, led to the closure of the oceanic basins and Neothetyan rifts. In some areas, slices of the oceanic crust have obducted onto the continental margins producing what could be called ophiolite assemblages or coloured melanges (e.g., mostly seen suture zone between Sanandaj–Sirjan and Zagros, and alongside Nehbandan fault in the east of Iran). The Upper Cretaceous-Paleocene granite of Mount Alvand was formed during the Laramide orogeny.

=== Alpine (Pyrenean and Styrian) ===
With regards to the geological evidence, this event was of compressional nature. This tectonic phase is represented by significant changes in the sedimentary environments, plutonism, and metamorphism (e.g., west of Central Iran, south of Central Alborz, Lut). The Sahand-Bazman volcanic arc or belt was mainly formed during the Eocene volcanism of the Alpine orogeny. The northern movement and the final collision of Afro-Arabia (significantly the Arabian plate) with the Iranian plate and the clockwise rotation of the Eurasian plate towards the Iranian plate caused the Alpine orogeny with the Pyrenean phase in the Late Eocene- Early Oligocene and the Styrian phase in the Middle Miocene respectively. The Zagros, Alborz, and Kopet-Dagh mountains were mainly formed in the Miocene during this orogenic phase.

=== Pasadenian ===
This orogenic phase began in the Late Pliocene and continued in the Pleistocene. The Pasadenian orogeny is the most important phase in forging the current shape of Iran. Some younger orogenic events might be the continuation of this orogenic phase (e.g., Alborz–Azerbaijan axis, Zagros, Central Iran). Sahand, Sabalan, Damavand, Bazman and Taftan were mainly formed during the volcanism of this orogenic phase. With an elevation of 5,610 metres (18,410 ft), Mount Damavand is the highest peak in Iran. This volcano first erupted in the Pleistocene about 1.78 million years ago and after several known eruptions around 600,000 and 280,000 years ago, it finally erupted in the Holocene almost 7300 years ago.

== See also ==
- National Geoscience Database of Iran
- National Geographical Organization of Iran
- Geology of Ray
