= Housing Foundation of Islamic Revolution =

Government agency about housing affairs in Iran

- بنیاد مسکن انقلاب اسلامی

Agency overview
- Formed: April 10, 1979; 47 years ago Founded by Ruhollah Khomeini
- Type: Government agency
- Headquarters: Tehran, Iran; 35.724559°N 51.444103°E
- Agency executives: Hossein Rouhaninejhad, The Representative of the Supreme Leader in the Foundation; Gholamreza Salehi, Head of the foundation
- Website: en.bonyadmaskan.ir

The Housing Foundation of Islamic Revolution (Persian: بنیاد مسکن انقلاب اسلامی) provides housing for deprived Iranians. It's also responsible for the development of the country's villages and the construction of urban housing units within the policies and programs of the Islamic Republic of Iran. It was established on April 10, 1979, by the order of Ruhollah Khomeini.

== Statute ==
The statute of The Housing Foundation of Islamic Revolution was approved by the Islamic Consultative Assembly on December 8, 1987. The statute was approved by the Guardian Council on December 30, 1987, and in a letter No. 1/5601 dated January 6, 1988, the executive order was issued by the then president.

=== Definition and purpose ===
Chapter One of the Statute: The Housing Foundation of Islamic Revolution, which is briefly called the Foundation in the statute, is the institution of the Islamic Revolution, which was established by the decree of the Supreme Leader of the Islamic Revolution, Ruhollah Khomeini, to provide housing for the deprived, especially the villagers, within the framework of government policies and programs.

=== Duties ===
Chapter Two of the Statute:

- Study and survey in the field of identifying and determining the housing needs of the deprived, both rural and urban, and providing the means for its implementation with the participation, cooperation and self-help of the people and various organizations.
- Preparation of cheap residential complexes and housing units and those implementation directly or with the participation of the people with the cooperation and coordination of relevant agencies in rural and urban areas.
- Preparation of lands required for the foundation plans and projects and belaying those lands.
- Assistance in providing the country's construction materials through production, supply, distribution.
- Supervise the payment and consumption of Qard al-Hasan loans for rural and cheap urban housing, which are provided from the country's financial resources and banking system.
- Preparation of master plans for improvement of roads in the villages, with the coordination of the relevant agencies and its implementation with the participation of the people from the funds approved by the government.
- Preparing and presenting the necessary plans for the reconstruction and renovation of rural residential areas damaged by war, floods, earthquakes and other natural disasters and their implementation with the participation of the people and coordination with relevant organizations and agencies.

=== Pillars ===
Chapter Three of the Statute; The pillars of the Housing Foundation of Islamic Revolution are:

A - Central Council
B - Supervisors
C - Inspectors

- The Central Council, as the highest decision-making body of the Foundation, has five members in the following order:
  - A- A clergyman (representative of the Supreme Leader if appointed).
  - B- Government representative (Minister of Roads and Urban Development).
  - C- Three engineers and construction and urban planning experts selected by the above two people.
- The clergyman, the member of the Central Council, in addition to his duties as a member of the council, will be responsible for complying with the foundation's activities in accordance with Islamic law.
- The Minister of Roads and Urban Development, as the representative of the government, in addition to the duties of membership in the council, will be accountable to the parliament within the limits of his authority.
- One of the members of the Central Council will be elected by the Central Council for a term of four years as the acting head and highest executive authority of the foundation, and his re-election will be unimpeded.
- Two inspectors will be selected from among the competent experts by the Central Council for a term of one year, and their re-election is unimpeded.

=== Regulations ===
Chapter Four of the Statute: Financial and general regulations;

- The budget, facilities and financial resources of the Housing Foundation of Islamic Revolution are:
1. Account number 100 of Ruhollah Khomeini
2. Cash and non-cash grants such as land, real estate, construction materials, etc. that are provided by the people, the government and other institutions and agencies.
3. Grants from the Mostazafan Foundation (used only to provide housing for the poor and deprived, and the Housing Foundation of Islamic Revolution sends an annual report of the activities carried out from the above funds to the Mostazafan Foundation).
4. Government grants, which are included in the annual budget of the whole country.
5. Revenue from the sale of building materials of workshops and factories belonging to the Housing Foundation of Islamic Revolution and the distribution of construction materials and the provision of technical services.
- The Housing Foundation of Islamic Revolution is exempt from paying income tax and income from participation and profit tax in affiliated companies.
- The Housing Foundation of Islamic Revolution has legal personality and is represented by the law of the foundation with the head of the foundation and can appoint a representative or lawyer to file lawsuits and complaints or for any other legal action and introduce it to judicial, administrative, disciplinary and registration authorities.
- In order to perform its duties, the Housing Foundation of Islamic Revolution can have branches and representative offices in the provinces, cities, and counties of the country.

== Deputies ==
- Housing Foundation of Islamic Revolution
    - Rural Development Deputy
    - Rural Reconstruction and Housing Affairs Deputy
    - Urban Housing Affairs Deputy
    - Provinces Support and Coordination Deputy
  - Corporate and Assemblies Affairs Office
    - Subsidiaries of the Housing Foundation of Islamic Revolution

== Branches ==
The Housing Foundation of Islamic Revolution has its headquarters in Tehran, and 31 branches in the provincial capitals and more than 278 sub-branches in the cities of the country. In addition, seven executive agencies are actually responsible for carrying out the special responsibility of the Housing Foundation in relation to housing development in cities and villages and low-income groups and the reconstruction of disaster-affected areas.

== Publications ==
The Housing Foundation of Islamic Revolution has a publishing center that has published more than 130 books so far. The foundation has a monthly magazine called Housing message (Persian: پیام مسکن) too.

== See also ==
- Islamic Development Organization
- Atmospheric Science and Meteorological Research Center
- Foundation for the Preservation and Publication of Sacred Defense Works and Values
- Geological Survey and Mineral Exploration of Iran
- Iran Technical and Vocational Training Organization
- Iranian Blood Transfusion Organization
- Iranian National Tax Administration
- National Geographical Organization of Iran
- National Geoscience Database of Iran
- National Organization for Civil Registration of Iran
- Office of Literature and Art of Resistance
