= Central Iranian Range =

Mountain range in Central Iran

Coordinates: 31.3780°N 54.3787°E

Geography

The Sahand-Bazman Volcanic and Plutonic Belt or the Sahand-Bazman Igneous Arc or the Central Iranian Range is a mountain range that is made by (both extrusive and intrusive) igneous and pyroclastic rocks. Located approximately 200 to 300 km east of and almost parallel to the Zagros Mountains, the Central Iranian Range stretches for about 900 km in a north-west-southeast direction from Mount Sahand in Azerbaijan in the north-west to Mount Bazman in Baluchistan in the southeastern part of Iran.

== Geology ==
This range was mainly formed during the Tertiary volcanic and orogenic phase and especially in the Eocene volcanism and plutonism. The Central Iranian Range or the Sahand-Bazman Volcanic Belt includes famous mountains such as the Sahand in East Azerbaijan Province, Mount Karkas in the Karkas Mountains and Mount Marshenan in Isfahan Province, the Jebal Barez, Mount Hezar and Mount Lalehzar in Kerman Province, and the Bazman in the Sistan va Baluchestan Province of Iran.
