= Nasrollah Khadem =

Iranian geological expert

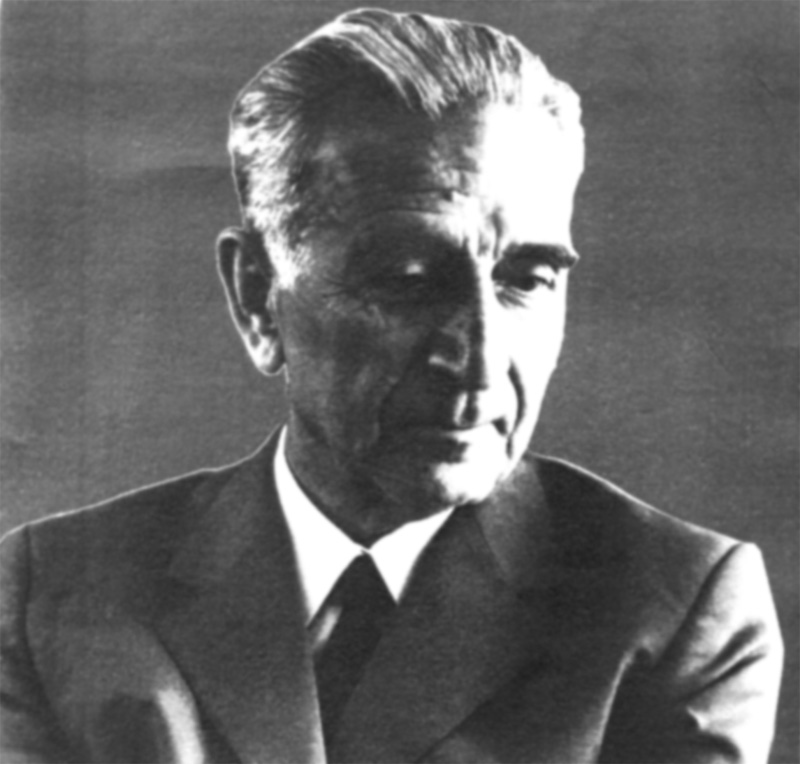
- Born: 1910; Tehran, Iran
- Died: May 5, 1999 (aged 89); Tehran, Iran
- Education: Geology, Mining engineering
- Alma mater: Mines ParisTech
- Occupations: Work as Presidency, Controller, Managing Director, Member of the Board, Engineering and Supervision of Iran Mines; Teaching geology at the College of Science, University of Tehran
- Known for: Founder of the Geological Survey and Mineral Exploration of Iran

Engineer Nasrollah Khadem (born 1910, died 1999) was one of the first prominent geological experts in Iran. He is the founder of the Geological Survey and Mineral Exploration of Iran. He played a major role in the development of Geology science and Mining engineering in Iran. Through his efforts, important mines were discovered and exploited in Iran.

== Life and education ==
Nasrollah Khadem was born on 1910 in Tehran, Iran. He spent his primary education there and after receiving a diploma from Elmieh High School of Tehran, in 1933, he left for France with the last group sent abroad by government to educate there. In France, he entered the Mines ParisTech, which has a great reputation in the field of mining. In 1939, at the age of 28, he graduated from this college in field of Mining engineering and returned to Iran.

== Careers ==
After returning to Iran, he went to military service. After completing his military service, he was hired by the government and held various positions in geology and mining. Respectively, he served in the positions:

- As an engineer in Shemshak Coal Mines
- Supervision of private mines in Alborz Province basin
- As the head of Shemshak Coal Mines
- Inspector of Coal Mines Company
- Managing Director of Hormozgan Province and Qeshm Island Mines
- Member of the Board of Directors of the Total Mining and Metal Melting Joint Stock Company
- CEO of the Total Mining and Metal Melting Joint Stock Company
- Founder and head of the Geological Survey and Mineral Exploration of Iran (GSI)

In parallel with these technical and administrative jobs, he also taught geology at the Faculty of Science in University of Tehran. His last job was as the head of the Geological Survey and Mineral Exploration of Iran (GSI), from which he retired in October 1974 at the age of 64.

== Foundation of the Geological Survey of Iran ==
In 1961, at the age of 50, he took charge of the establishment of the Geological Survey and Mineral Exploration of Iran (GSI). With the efforts of Nasrollah Khadem, the law establishing of GSI was approved by National Consultative Assembly and Senate of Iran, and Geological Survey and Mineral Exploration of Iran (GSI) officially started its work in 1962. In a short period of time, the basic knowledge of geology of the Geological Survey and Mineral Exploration of Iran (GSI) was expanded and attracted the attention of world circles. In 1974, in the Commission for the Geological Map of the World or in brief CGWM, which was established in Paris, despite the decades of experience of geological organizations of other countries in the region, preparation and integration of geological maps of the Middle East was entrusted to the Geological Survey and Mineral Exploration of Iran (GSI). Currently, the Geological Survey and Mineral Exploration of Iran (GSI) is implementing 6 of the 23 projects approved by the commission, and 6 projects are being implemented in cooperation with the GSI. Responsibility for Middle East projects has been delegated to the Geological Survey and Mineral Exploration of Iran (GSI) by the Commission.

== Death ==
Nasrollah Khadem died on May 5, 1999, at the age of 89 in Tehran, Iran. He was buried in Behesht-e Zahra.

== Memorial ==
An orthorhombic-dipyramidal mineral containing aluminum, fluorine, hydrogen, oxygen, and sulfur with chemical formula Al(SO4)F•5(H2O) was named Khademite in memorial of Nasrollah Khadem. The mineral was discovered by Barian, Bertelon and Sadrzadeh in Saghand, Rabatat Rural District, Kharanaq District, Ardakan County, Yazd Province, Iran in 1962, and was named in honor of Nasrollah Khadem, then head of the Geological Survey and Mineral Exploration of Iran (GSI).

== See also ==
- Geology of Iran
- National Geoscience Database of Iran
- Geological Survey and Mineral Exploration of Iran
- Fereydun Sahabi
- Hamidreza Moghaddamfar
