= Shir Kuh =

Mountain in Yazd province, Iran

Shir Kuh شیرکوه
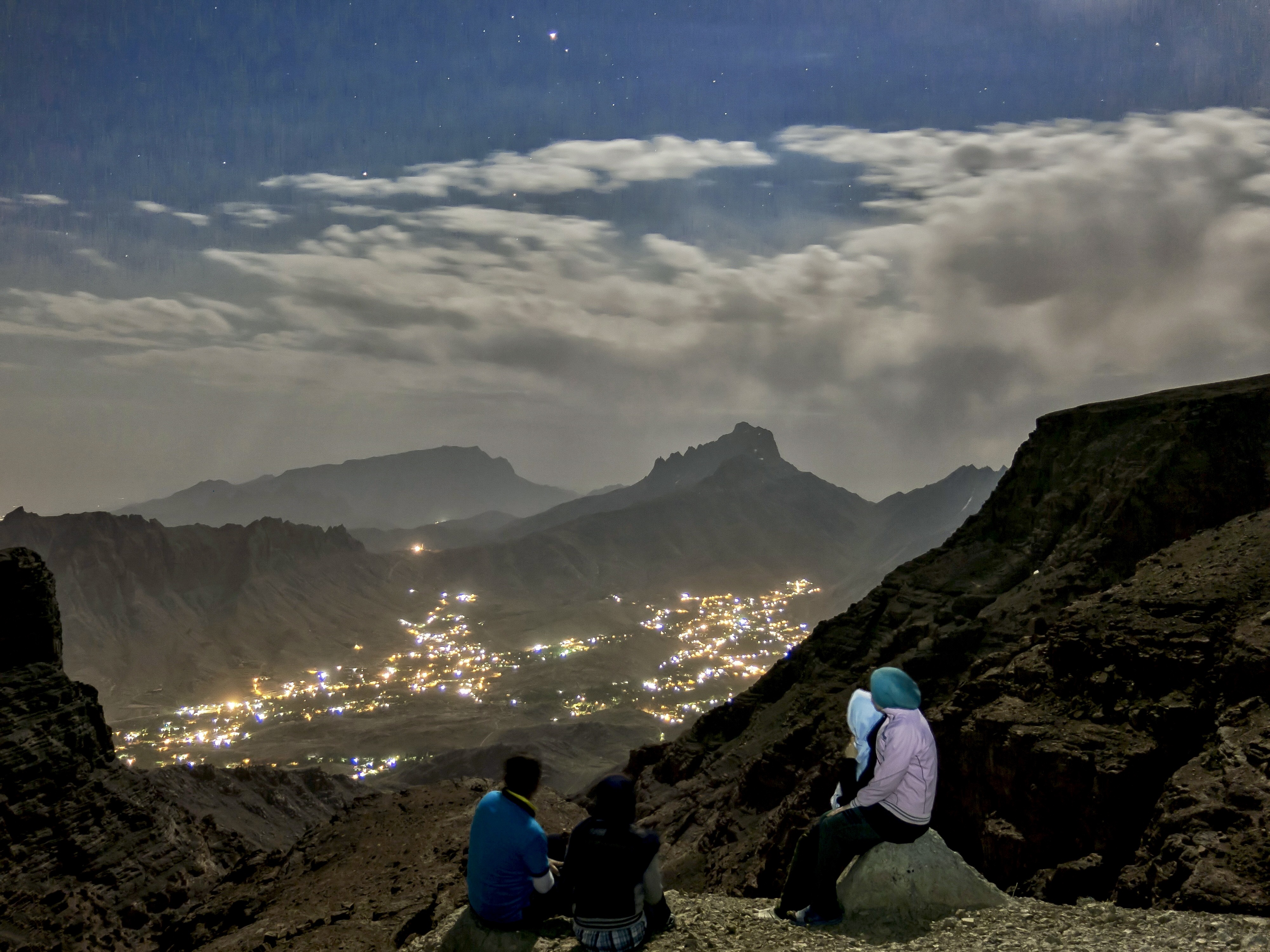

Highest point
- Elevation: 4,055 m (13,304 ft)
- Prominence: 2,271 m (7,451 ft)
- Listing: Ultra
- Coordinates: 31°36′21″N 54°04′06″E

Naming
- English translation: The lion mountain
- Language of name: Persian

Geography
- Location within Iran
- Location: Yazd province, Iran
- Parent range: Central Iranian ranges

Shir Kuh or Shirkuh (Persian: شیرکوه) is a high peak (4,055 m or 13,304 ft) in central Iran about 40 km (25 mi) south-west of the city of Yazd in Yazd province.

== Geology ==
Geologically, Shir Kuh is made chiefly of Jurassic granite surrounded by Cretaceous rocks. It is located almost in the vicinity of the Sahand-Bazman volcanic arc, a volcanic arc that was formed during the Tertiary and mainly in the Eocene volcanism. Shir Kuh consists mainly of intrusive rocks (Jurassic granite) that were made in the Late Cimmerian Orogeny in the Late Jurassic. This mountain is located in the Sanandaj-Sirjan geological and structural zone. Sanadaj-Sirjan was subjected to magmatism and metamorphism in the Paleozoic and Mesozoic.

== Climate ==
Having a high elevation, Shir Kuh and its neighbourhood have a cold mountain climate although the region is placed in a location that is surrounded by a hot semi-desert climate.

== See also ==
- List of ultras of West Asia
