= Geological Survey and Mineral Exploration of Iran =

Iranian Geological & Mineral Exploration government agency

Agency overview
- Formed: 1962; 64 years ago
- Type: Government agency
- Headquarters: 1387835841, Tehran, Iran, Azadi Square, Meraj Boulevard; 35.696634°N 51.331928°E
- Motto: GSI
- Employees: about 1000
- Agency executive: Daryoush Esmaeily
- Parent department: Ministry of Industry, Mine and Trade
- Child agency: National Geoscience Database of Iran
- Website: www.gsi.ir

The Geological Survey and Mineral Exploration of Iran or in brief GSI is a government agency responsible for conducting geological and mineral surveys throughout the country, collecting the results of activities carried out in this field, establishing coordination, preparing and publishing geological maps of Iran. It is a subdivision of the Ministry of Industry, Mine and Trade, which was established in 1962 in cooperation with United Nations.

== History ==
Nasrollah Khadem, graduate of Mining engineering in Mines ParisTech, founded the Geological Survey and Mineral Exploration of Iran (GSI) in 1962 and was the head of this organization until 1974. The law establishing GSI was approved by National Consultative Assembly and Senate of Iran on August 20, 1959, and Geological Survey and Mineral Exploration of Iran (GSI) officially started its work in 1962. Therefore, according to the twenty-seventh principle of the amendment to the Constitution of the Islamic Republic of Iran, the license to establish the Geological Survey and Mineral Exploration of Iran (GSI) was issued based on an 8-article statute, which is summarized below:

- Article 1: It was decided that the government should establish a single organization called the Geological Survey and Mineral Exploration of Iran (GSI) in order to conduct geological surveys throughout the country, collect all the work done in this field and prepare, complete and publish geological maps of Iran.
- Article 2: A council called the Supreme Geological Council consisting of representatives of University of Tehran, National Iranian Oil Company, Plan and Budget Organization of the Islamic Republic of Iran and Ministry of Industries and Mines (Iran).
- Article 3: The head of organization should be appointed from among engineers with experience in mining or geology for a period of three years.
- Article 4: The Geological Survey and Mineral Exploration of Iran (GSI) should operate independent under the supervision of the Ministry of Industries and Mines.
- Article 5: The expenses of organization should be provided from the revenues of Ministry of Industries and Mines, National Iranian Oil Company and Plan and Budget Organization of the Islamic Republic of Iran, as well as from the revenues from the sale of publications and services.
- Article 6: Government and non-governmental companies and institutions should be in contact with the Geological Survey and Mineral Exploration of Iran (GSI) to provide and coordinate similar tasks such as preparing maps or geological reports of areas from all over the country.
- Article 7: Geological sections excavations performed by companies, contractors and institutions in the field of tunneling, canals, deep wells and boreholes for mines should be provided to the Geological Survey and Mineral Exploration of Iran (GSI).
- Article 8: The Ministry of Industries and Mines will be in charge of implementing this law.

In 1999, the exploration tasks of the Ministry of Industries and Mines were handed over entirely to the Geological Survey and Mineral Exploration of Iran. The organization is currently responsible for geological studies of the country and exploratory assessment of mineral resources except hydrocarbons (Petroleum and Natural gas).

== Organization chart ==
The Geological Survey and Mineral Exploration of Iran (GSI) includes these administrative departments:

- Deputy Minister and Director General
  - Deputy for Planning, Management Development and Support
    - Management of Planning and Technology
    - Management of Financial Affairs
    - Management of Administrative and Human Resources Development
  - Deputy of Exploration
    - Management of Exploration Matters
      - Regional and metallurgical explorations
      - Metal Explorations
      - Non-metallic Explorations
      - Evaluation and Technical and Economic Studies
    - Management of Exploration Support
      - Geochemical Explorations
      - Geophysical Explorations
      - Operations and Explorations Drilling
      - Surveying Group
    - Management of Ore Dressing and Mineral Dressing
      - Mineral Dressing Group
      - Meta Production and Application of Minerals
  - Deputy of Geology
    - Management of Regional Geology
      - Geological Surveying Group
      - Lithology Group
      - Tectonics and Paleontology Group
    - Management of Geohazard, Engineering and Environmental Geology
      - Geohazard and Engineering Geology Group
      - Tectonics Earthquake Group
      - Geotechnic Group
      - Environmental Geology Group
    - Management of Marine Geology
      - Sedimentology Group
      - Marine Chemistry Group
      - Marine Geophysics Group
      - Geomorphology Group
      - Marine and Coastal Morphodynamics Group
  - Management of Geometics
    - GIS Group
    - Integration and modeling Group
    - Telemetry Group
    - Cartography Group
    - Aerial Geophysics Group
  - Management of Director General
    - Public Relations Office
    - International Relations Office
    - Library Office
  - Management of Laboratories
    - Chemical Decomposition Laboratory
    - Geochemistry Laboratory
      - Soil section
      - Water section
    - Laboratory of Precious Metals
    - Mineralogy Laboratory
      - XRD section
      - Study section of polished cuts
      - FTIR section
      - Heavy Mineral Analysis Section
  - Management of National Geosciences Database of Iran (NGDIR)
    - Resource and Reserves Database Group
    - Geological Database Group
    - Geographic Database Group
  - Management of Supervision and Evaluation
    - Monitoring Group
    - Control and evaluation Group
  - Earth Sciences Research Office
    - Research and educational affairs administration
    - Research Groups
  - Management of the Northeastern Region (Mashhad Branch)
  - Management of the Northwestern Region (Tabriz Branch)
  - Management of the Southeastern Region (Kerman Branch)
  - Management of the Southern Region (Shiraz Branch)
  - Management of the Southwestern Region (Ahwaz Branch)
  - Quaternary Research Department
  - Gemology Department
  - Geotourism Department
  - Security Department

== Objectives of the organization ==
The policy of the Geological Survey and Mineral Exploration of Iran (GSI) according to the articles of association is to pursue the following goals:

1. National policy and planning in geology and exploration
2. Identifying geological environments and mineral potentials of the country and presenting the results in the form of "basic and practical information" for use in infrastructure, development, economic and social projects
3. Research in the field of recognizing seismic areas of the country along with providing executive solutions for industrial urban development areas with the aim of reducing and preventing social and economic damage
4. Research in the field of coastal engineering knowledge and exploration of non-living natural materials in the country's aquatic environments
5. Exploration of new mineral reserves of the country, in different phases of regional exploration, search and public exploration up to the pre-feasibility stage with the aim of providing the necessary grounds and advantages for job creation, growth and development of the country
6. Collection, processing and updating of geosciences data and information and infrastructure development with the aim of providing the information needs of scholars and miners and mining industries
7. Implementation of joint research projects (inside and outside the country)
8. Assistance in applied education of higher education centers of the country

=== The perspective of twenty-year plan of the GSI ===
The perspective of 20-year plan of the Geological Survey and Mineral Exploration of Iran (GSI) emphasizes the following:

- Providing the necessary grounds and infrastructure for the growth of knowledge-based activities and sustainable development of the country through the identification of geological environments
- Identify resources and discover mineral reserves
- Identify the processes that create and control geological hazards and measure their behavior
- Expanding Geoscience Databases

=== Geology department strategy ===
According to the perspective of 20-year plan of the GSI, the geology department pursues the following items:

- Help create a safe community and a healthy environment
- Development of information infrastructures based on the growth of knowledge-based activities
- Development of human resources and capabilities of geoscience technology
- Development of geological standards in the design and implementation of development plans
- Active presentation of information in the field of geosciences

=== Exploration department strategy ===
According to the perspective of 20-year plan of the GSI, the exploration department pursues the following items:

- Increasing the country's competitiveness in the mining sector through the exploration of mineral reserves
- Expand mineral exploration capacity
- Development of human resources and capabilities of exploratory technology
- Participation in regional development and job creation

== Personnels and branches ==
The Geological Survey and Mineral Exploration of Iran (GSI) has about 1000 personnel with high scientific degrees and using laboratory equipment and computer facilities. The organization is headquartered in Tehran and has 16 general branches covering almost all regions of Iran for geological and indigenous exploration studies. The GSI also has mutual cooperation and joint research programs with other organizations in Iran and abroad.

== The GSI products ==
Among the services and products of the Geological Survey and Mineral Exploration of Iran (GSI), the following can be mentioned:

- Preparation of geological map, economic geology map, engineering geology map, environmental hazards map, geochemical and aerial geophysical maps of the entire area of Iran
- Preparation of 2351 maps in different geological information structure and different scales
- Preparation and publication of 88 volumes of books in the field of geoscience
- Preparation and publication of 2 journals in the field of geoscience (monthly and quarterly)
- Provides 825 reports of earthquakes and other geological events
- Preparation and presentation of 6811 geological articles in various scientific circles
- Preparation and presentation of mineral information database
- Collaboration in making a documentary film in the field of geoscience

== The Journal ==
The Geological Survey and Mineral Exploration of Iran (GSI) has been publishing Scientific Quarterly Journal of Geosciences since the fall of 1992 in order to transfer geological knowledge and publish new scientific findings.

== The Museum ==
The Museum of the Geological Survey and Mineral Exploration of Iran (GSI) is a specialized museum that called Geoscience Museum, established in 1959 and specifically contains samples of rocks, minerals, fossils and old mining objects obtained from different parts inside and outside the country. In this museum, more than 400 samples of rocks, 1500 samples of fossils and more than 1400 samples of minerals from Iran and other countries are kept. The museum also has 65 instances of ancient mining tools and equipment. The various sections of the Museum of Earth Sciences include the section on antique mining tools and archaeological objects, rocks, precious and semi-precious minerals, fossils, vertebrate fossils, and the Geological Screening Film Hall. In the special sections, those interested can also get acquainted with the meteorites and quartz crystals grown by local experts, and the bone and fossil footprints and dinosaur eggs. Also in the fossil vertebrate section, there are significant fossils from all Cambrian geological periods up to the present time. The fossils have been collected in two groups of plants and animals from different formations of the country. In 2008, the museum was completely renovated.

== The Library ==
The library of the Geological Survey and Mineral Exploration of Iran (GSI) was established in 1959 with the aim of collecting, organizing and disseminating geological information. The GSI library currently has the most complete collection of specialized books and publications in geosciences with more than 10,000 titles of books and reports in Persian and Latin. The GSI library consists of the following sections:

1. Reference services
2. Organizing information
3. Resources and deposits
4. Periodicals
5. Order and receive
6. Library Archive
7. Publishing sales
8. Visual and Publications

== See also ==
- Geology of Iran
- National Geoscience Database of Iran
- National Geographical Organization of Iran
