= Atmospheric Science and Meteorological Research Center =

Iranian research center

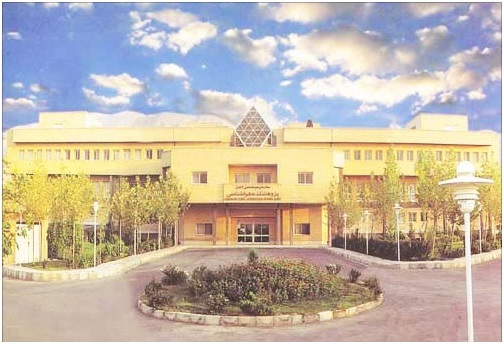

Agency overview
- Formed: founded in 1989, started officially in 1995
- Type: Government agency
- Headquarters: Pajoohesh Blvd, Shahid Kharrazi highway, Tehran, Iran; 35.7492247°N 51.1721805°E
- Motto: ASMERC
- Employees: 21 (More than 200 scientists and experts are involved)
- Agency executive: Dr Mehdi Rahnama
- Parent department: Iran Meteorological Organization
- Parent agency: Ministry of Roads & Urban Development (Iran)
- Website: www.asmerc.ac.ir

The Iran Atmospheric Science and Meteorological Research Center or in brief ASMERC as a member of the World Meteorological Organization (WMO) is a research center is affiliated with the Iran Meteorological Organization and is a subset of the Ministry of Roads & Urban Development of Iran.

The ASMERC research institute started with the aim of conducting studies and researches related to meteorological science in 1989 and is headquartered in Tehran, Iran.

== History ==
The Atmospheric Science and Meteorological Research Center (ASMERC) was founded in 1989 with the approval of the Ministry of Science, Research and Technology (Iran). In 1995, after receiving a definite license for its first research institute called "Meteorological Research Institute", it officially started working. At the beginning of this research, in addition to defining and performing its independent tasks, it was within the framework of three research groups.

== Scientific structure ==
The Atmospheric Science and Meteorological Research Center (ASMERC) soon expanded to nine research groups. With nine research groups in various fields of meteorology, this research institute conducts studies and researches related to pure meteorological science and recognizes, expands and presents their applications. Also, an important part of the activities of this research institute is educational cooperation with higher education centers in fields related to meteorological sciences.

- Nine research groups of the ASMERC include:
1. Dynamic & Synoptic Meteorology
2. Climatology
3. Physical Meteorology & Weather Modification
4. Agrometeorology
5. Hydrometeorology
6. Atmospheric Chemistry, Ozone, and Air pollution
7. Marine Meteorology & Physical Oceanography
8. Atmospheric prospecting
9. Aeronautical Meteorology

== Projects ==
Among the successful projects of the ASMERC, could be mention the production of an automated system for issuing accurate forecasts of Precipitation, Temperature and water level of reservoirs and dams for some catchment areas of the country (such as Karun).

In the field of manufacturing technical devices and tools, the Radiosonde has been manufactured by the ASMERC in Iran.

== Areas of activity ==
Some of the most important areas of activity of the ASMERC are:

- Issuance of point forecasts for various meteorological quantities such as daily minimum and maximum temperatures, precipitation, humidity, wind at ground level and higher levels
- Calculation and forecasting of meteorological indicators such as heat index and ...
- Provide meteorological databases for all parts of the country, even where there is no history of meteorological monitoring and data registration
- Meteorological studies related to the use of renewable energy
- Holding training courses in various meteorological trends

== Scientific activities ==
The main purpose of The Atmospheric Science and Meteorological Research Center (ASMERC) is research in various fields of meteorology and atmospheric sciences. The research statistics of the ASMERC are:

- 272 scientific articles in domestic journals and conferences
- 22 internationally recognized articles (ISI)
- Holding 5 conferences
- Collaboration in preparing 196 articles with 36 scientific centers

== See also ==
- List of Iranian research centers
- Science and technology in Iran
- Iran Meteorological Organization
- National Geographical Organization of Iran
