= Iran Meteorological Organization =

Meteorological service of Iran

Islamic Republic of Iran Meteorological Organization

Agency overview
- Jurisdiction: Government of Iran
- Headquarters: Tehran
- Agency executive: Sahar Tajbakhsh
- Parent agency: Ministry of Roads and Urban Development
- Website: www.weather.ir

The Iran Meteorological Organization, also called the Met Department, is an agency of the Ministry of Roads and Urban Development of the Government of Iran. Headquartered in Tehran, it is the principal agency responsible for meteorological observations, weather forecasting and seismology, operating hundreds of observation stations across Iran.

== History ==
In 1928, the meteorological office was included in the Barzegaran school curriculum, taught by French teachers. The first platform for the measurement of meteorological data, air temperature, relative humidity and rainfall was built and completed in 1929 in the Barzegaran school. After World War II, the first meteorological observatories were established in Iran by the Allies in 1948.

== Heads of Meteorological Organization ==
=== Before the revolution ===
- Professor Mohammad Hassan Ganji from 1956 to 1968
- Abdolhossein Parviz Navai from 1968 to 1978
- Jinous Nemat Mahmoudi (Supervisor of 1978)
- General Asghar Behsarsht (1978)

=== After the revolution ===
- Cyrus Ahadpour from 1357 to 1358
- Hassan Hajilari from 1358 to 1359
- Kazem Samadian from 1359 to 1360
- Ali Mohammad Nourian from 1360 to 1372
- Hossein Ali Taravat from 1372 to 1373
- Ali Mohammad Noorian from 1373 to 1388 (second time)
- Bahram Sanaei from 2009 to 2013
- Davood Parhizgar from 2013 to 2018
- Sahar Tajbakhsh since March 2018

== See also ==
- Atmospheric Science and Meteorological Research Center
