= National Cartographic Center of Iran =

Main organization for cartography in Iran

National Cartography Center of Iran (NCC)
- سازمان نقشه برداری کشور

Agency overview
- Formed: 1953
- Jurisdiction: Islamic Republic of Iran
- Headquarters: Tehran, Iran
- Agency executive: Ali Javidaneh, Head
- Website: www.ncc.gov.ir

The National Cartography Center of Iran (NCCC, Persian: سازمان نقشه برداری کشور) is the main organization for cartography in Iran. It is administered and funded by the Government of Iran, as part of the Plan and Budget Organization. The NCC was established in 1953.

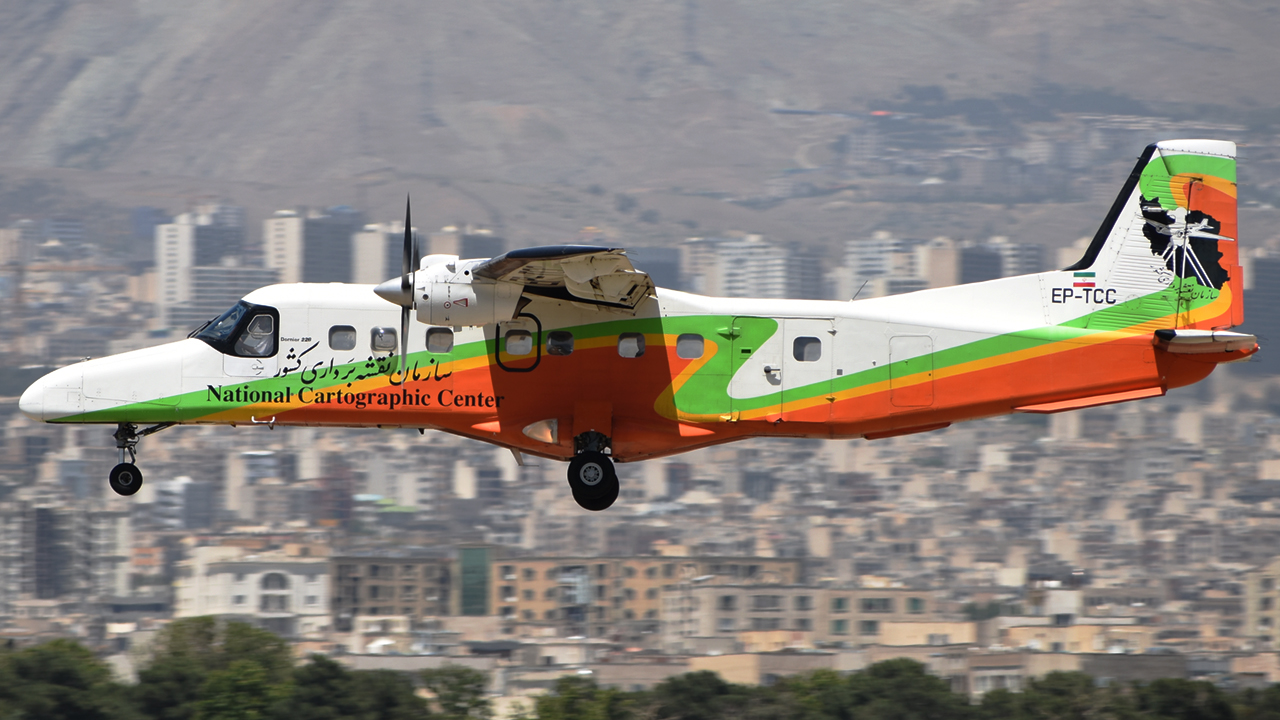
Aircraft Dornier Do-228-212 used by NCC for aerial survey.

== See also ==
- National mapping agency
- National Geographical Organization of Iran
