= Mount Lalehzar =

Mountain in Iran

Mount Lalehzar is a mountain that is located near the town of Lalehzar about 40 kilometres north-east of the city of Baft in Kerman Province. With an elevation of 4351 metres, this mountain is among of the highest peaks of Iran. Made chiefly of Eocene andesite and pyroclastic rocks, Mount Lalehzar is situated in a central Iranian range, Sahand-Bazman volcanic range or belt, a mountain range which was formed mainly during Eocene volcanism and that stretches approximately from Sahand Volcano in the north-west of Iran to Bazman Volcano in the south-east of Iran.
