= Karkas Mountains =

Mountain range in Isfahan Province, Iran

Coordinates: 33°27′21″N 51°48′00″E

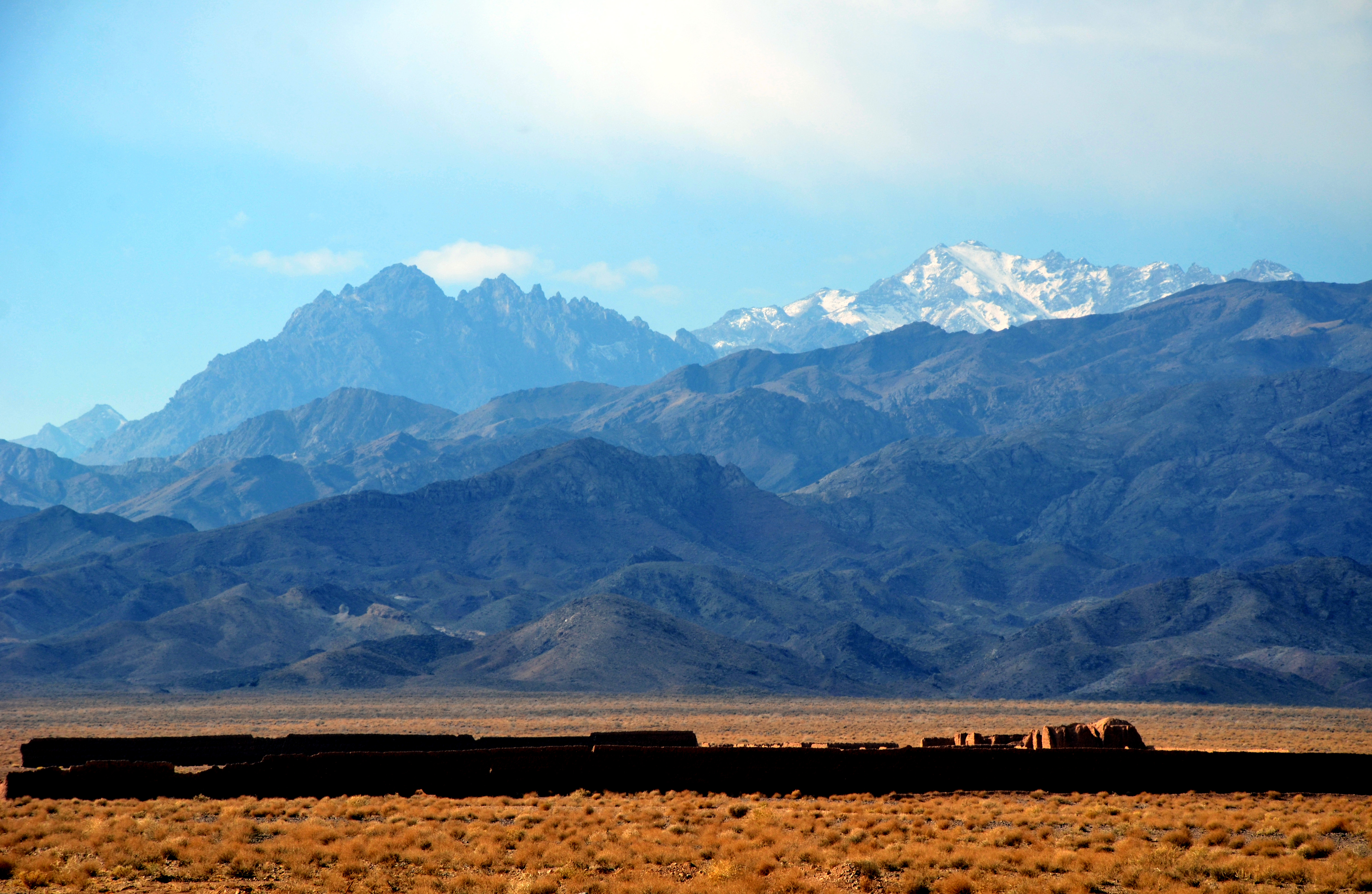

Geography
- Location within Iran

The Karkas mountain chain (Persian: کوهستان كركس or رشته‌کوه کرکس Reshteh kuh-e Karkas) is a mountain range in central Iran. Having a northwest-southeast direction, it is stretched from Kashan to Ardestan for more than 100 kilometres. With an elevation of 3895 metres, the highest peak of the Karkas Mountains is Mount Karkas which is situated close to Natanz.

== Etymology ==
Although in Persian karkas means vulture, it is possible that the name of this mountain chain is derived from the settlement activity of the ancient Kassites in the area, because in the ancient Assyrian language Kar-Kassi means "town or land of the Kassites" (modified interpretation after Roman Ghirshman, 1954).

== Geology ==
The Karkas Mountains were formed mainly during the Eocene volcanism. Located in the Sahand-Bazman volcanic and plutonic belt, this mountain range is composed predominantly of the Eocene volcanic rocks of the Tertiary volcanism. Aside from the Tertiary igneous (plutonic and volcanic) rocks, there are also pyroclastic and sedimentary rocks. There is a Precambrian-Paleozoic basement in the central part of this mountain chain.
