= Jaghatai Mountains =

Mountain range In Iran

Joghātaī Mountains

Highest point
- Peak: Mount Zar
- Elevation: 2,945 m (9,662 ft)

Geography
- Country: Iran
- Province: Razavi Khorasan
- Range coordinates: 36°30′19″N 57°07′03″E

The Jaghatai Mountain Range is located in the western part of Razavi Khorasan Province in northeast Iran. Running in a northwest-southeast direction, the Jaghatai Range stretches from the west and southwest of the town of Jaghatai in the northwest to the northeast and east of the city of Sabzevar in the southeast. With an elevation of 2945 metres, Mount Zar is the highest point of the range. Mount Nazargah is situated in the central part of the range, northwest of the city of Sabzevar. The mountain range is located in a region with a cold semi-desert climate.

== Geology ==
Made of ophiolite, an assemblage of mafic igneous rocks representing remnants of former oceanic crust, the Jaghatai Range was formed in the Miocene and the Pliocene during the Alpine orogeny.
