= Mount Marshenan =

Mountain in Iran

Mount Marshenan or Mount Mareshnan (‘Kuh-e Marshenan’ or ‘Kuh-e Mareshnan’) is a mountain that is located approximately 60 kilometres north-east of the city of Isfahan and 30 kilometres north of Kuhpayeh. With an elevation of 3330 metres, this mountain is about 15 kilometres south-east of Zefreh and 3 kilometres south of the village of Marshenan in Isfahan Province, almost in central Iran. Made chiefly of Eocene andesite and pyroclastic rocks, Mount Marshenan is situated in a central Iranian range, Sahand-Bazman volcanic range or belt, a mountain range which was formed mainly during Eocene volcanism and that stretches approximately from Sahand volcano in the north-west of Iran to Bazman volcano in the south-east of Iran.
