= National Geoscience Database of Iran =

Iranian Geoscience government agency

Agency overview
- Formed: 1999; 26 years ago
- Type: Government agency
- Headquarters: 1461655694, Tehran, Iran, Sadeghieh 2nd Square, North Shohada Boulevard, Corner of 15th Alley, No. 109; 35.7235136°N 51.3378799°E
- Motto: NGDIR
- Employees: 17
- Agency executive: Omid Ardabili
- Parent department: Ministry of Industry, Mine and Trade
- Parent agency: Geological Survey and Mineral Exploration of Iran
- Website: www.ngdir.ir

The National Geoscience Database of Iran (Persian: پایگاه ملی داده‌های علوم زمین کشور) or in brief NGDIR is a scientific and research government agency in Iran which works in the field of Geology of Iran and centrally manages Geoscience data. This center was established in 1999 in the field of data collection authority with the aim of managing, preserving and sharing Geoscience data.

== History ==
The core of the National Geoscience Database of Iran (NGDIR) was established in 1999 at the Geological Survey and Mineral Exploration of Iran and its main activities until 2000 is limited to collecting mineral information in the library of the organization and creating the first mineral database and collection and unification of map information in the Geological Survey and Mineral Exploration of Iran. In the same year, the creating of Geoscience Database task was assigned to the Ministry of Industries and Mines (Iran). Since then, the National Geoscience Database of Iran's structure became more independent and thematic development of its databases in the fields of Geology, Geography, Mining, Risk, etc. was put on its agenda. As the amount of information increased, the only way to provide the proper provision of information was to create a fully dynamic website. As a result, the site was designed so that it is possible to enter, edit and even manage information on the site without specifying the time and place on the Internet. In 2015, according to paragraph b, Article 157 of the Fifth Five-Year Development Plan of the Islamic Republic of Iran, based on launching a comprehensive database of geosciences and simultaneously increasing the activity of the Geological Survey and Mineral Exploration of Iran in interdisciplinary sciences and expanding its activities, objectives and procedures of the National Geoscience Database of Iran (NGDIR) were reviewed.

== Organization chart ==
- National Geoscience Database of Iran (NGDIR)
  - Recognition and standardization of geoscience data
  - Database Center
  - Geoscience information presentation system

== Administrative structure ==
The National Geoscience Database of Iran (NGDIR) consists of the following administrative sections:

- Information presentation system
- Data cognition and standardization
- Database Center
- Information Technology Affairs
- Administration and services
- Geosciences Library
- Management Affairs

== Strategic goals ==
The National Geoscience Database of Iran (NGDIR) pursues the following strategic goals:

- Focus on database maintenance cycles on making the most of available resources
- Maintenance of data and supply of geoscience of the country
- Prepare standards for data, products and processes in various fields of geoscience
- Validation and evaluation of data and products of geoscience
- Presenting data and products of geoscience from different portals and in line with modern technology in accordance with the needs of their stakeholders
- Research, compilation and dissemination of analytical and decision-making data models from geoscience data
- Implementing service orientation and mechanization geoscience database services
- Creating a life cycle for geoscience data and supplies
- Intellectual profitability and providing a unique identifier for geoscience supplies
- Effective and timely response to geoscience events
- Becoming a place of exchange of data and supplies of geoscience
- Providing a sustainable platform for interaction, reflection, exchange and gathering knowledge and opinions of those involved in geoscience
- Gain global credibility by providing data and achievements of the country's geoscience at the international level
- Monetize the power, experience, expertise, data and services available in the database
- Ensure the successful implementation of the activities of the database by providing the necessary legal bases

== Data management process ==
The data management process in the National Geoscience Database of Iran (NGDIR) includes a cycle of data collection and retrieval, data storage and presentation standards. The first stage of data management includes recognizing and standardizing the data produced by different groups in the Geological Survey and Mineral Exploration of Iran. The output of the recognition and standardization section is the input of the database process. At this stage, the input data is evaluated and analyzed and then stored in a standard format in databases. The next stage is to provide information in which the data stored in the databases is presented as standard. The data life cycle does not end with the presentation of data because the data needs to be constantly updated to provide accurate and up-to-date information to users, so the data re-enters the cycle after update.

== See also ==
- Geology of Iran
- Ministry of Industries and Mines (Iran)
- National Geographical Organization of Iran
