= Cimmerian Orogeny =

Orogeny during the Triassic Period

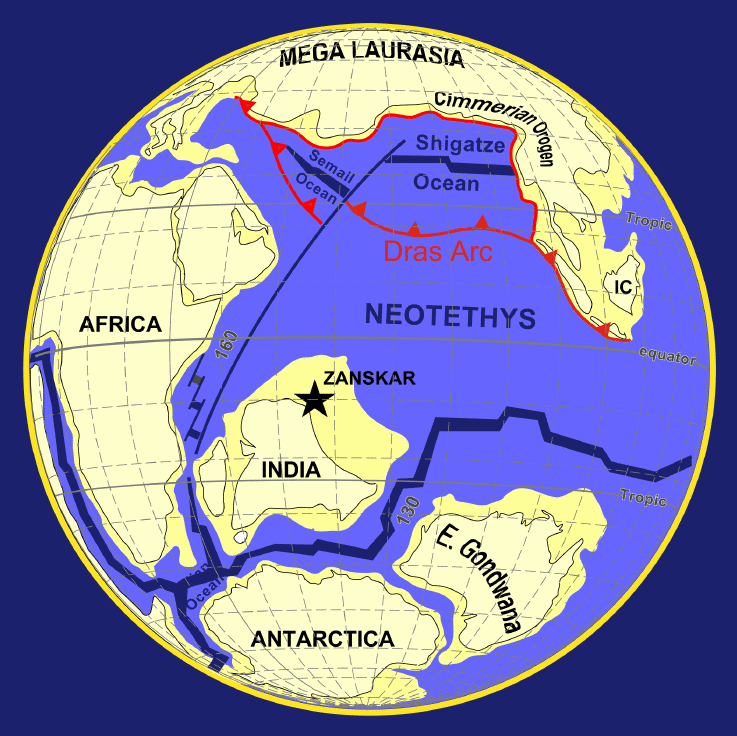
Cimmeria collided with North and South China blocks, closing the Paleo-Tethys Ocean between them and forming mountains. Map c. 100 Ma

The Cimmerian Orogeny was an orogeny that created mountain ranges that now lie in Central Asia. The orogeny is believed to have begun during the Late Triassic about 240–200 million years ago, when parts of the Cimmerian continent collided with the southern coast of Kazakhstania and North and South China, closing the ancient Paleo-Tethys Ocean between them. Blocks that derive from that continent now form part of Turkey, Iran, Tibet and western Southeast Asia. Much of the plate's northern boundary formed mountain ranges that were as high as the present-day Himalayas.

== See also ==
- Hercynian orogeny - an orogeny that preceded the Cimmerian orogeny
- Alpine orogeny - an orogeny that succeeded the Cimmerian orogeny
