= National Geographical Organization of Iran =

Geography center of Iran

- سازمان جغرافیایی ایران یا سازمان جغرافیایی نیروهای مسلح

- Flag of National Geographical Organization of the Armed Forces of Iran

Department overview
- Formed: 1921; 104 years ago
- Type: Government agency
- Headquarters: Tehran, Iran; 35.7274119°N 51.4488425°E
- Motto: N.G.O Iran
- Department executive: Majid Fakhri
- Parent Government agency: Ministry of Defence and Armed Forces Logistics of Iran
- Website: www.ngo-iran.ir

The National Geographical Organization of Iran or National Geographical Organization of the Armed Forces of Iran (Persian: سازمان جغرافیایی ایران, or Persian: سازمان جغرافیایی نیروهای مسلح) is an Iranian government agency affiliated to the Ministry of Defence and Armed Forces Logistics of Iran, which has been established to prepare quick and accurate access spatial information of the country and other areas required by the Armed Forces of Iran.

== History ==
The National Geographical Organization of Iran was officially founded in 1951 to prepare maps and survey geographical activities. Of course, origin of this mapping organization and formation of surveying and cartography branches, was laid in 1921, and in the course of its evolution, it performed responsibilities in accordance with the needs, missions and organizational duties. Finally, it is identified as the National Geographical Organization of Iran or National Geographical Organization of the Armed Forces of Iran. Currently, the National Geographical Organization of Iran, along with the National Cartographic Center, conducts affairs related to surveying and preparation and production of spatial information, but matters related to military maps, national borders and geographical services required by the Armed Forces are performed only through the National Geographical Organization of Iran.

== Activities ==
As the first country in the Middle East, in 1955, the National Geographical Organization of Iran carried out the first analog aerial photography from all over of Iran with a scale of 1: 50,000 and then, using conversion devices (mechanical) and performing engineering steps, was able to prepare and extract topographic maps. Due to the technology conditions that were used at that time, the preparation of the map lasted until 1971 and about 2550 sheets of topographic maps were prepared and produced at a scale of 1: 50,000.

In recent years, the National Geographical Organization of Iran has been able to change the aerial photography system to take the first digital aerial photography with new systems (ULTRA CAM D digital cameras) and done digital aerial photography projects for many cities of Iran.

Among the capabilities and duties of the National Geographical Organization of Iran, the following can be mentioned:

- Demarcation of the borders of the country
- Production of spatial information in the national and regional areas
- Design, implementation and monitoring of satellite and classical geodetic operations
- Perform processing, classifying and interpreting aerial and satellite images
- Review old maps with different methods of using satellite images and aerial photography
- Preparation of thematic and prominent maps and execution of all stages of cartography
- Preparation and printing of photo maps (using aerial photographs and satellite images)
- Collection and compilation of geographical information
- Design and printing (including: typesetting, design, assembly, lithography and printing) types of books and scientific and technical publications
- Performing various activities related to remote sensing
- implementation of Geographic information system (GIS)
- Design and implementation of hydrographic operations
- Preparation and construction of scale model from facilities, equipment and natural land features
- Design and conversion of all photogrammetric devices from classical (analog) system to analytical and digital system
- Holding various advanced courses (theoretical and practical) in the field of surveying engineering

Also, the Surveying Technical School of the Geographical Organization is affiliated with this organization, which present the surveying field in undergraduate and associate degrees.

== See also ==
- National Cartographic Center of Iran
- Ministry of Defence and Armed Forces Logistics (Iran)
- Geology of Iran
- National Geoscience Database of Iran
