= Sahand =

Stratovolcano in Iran

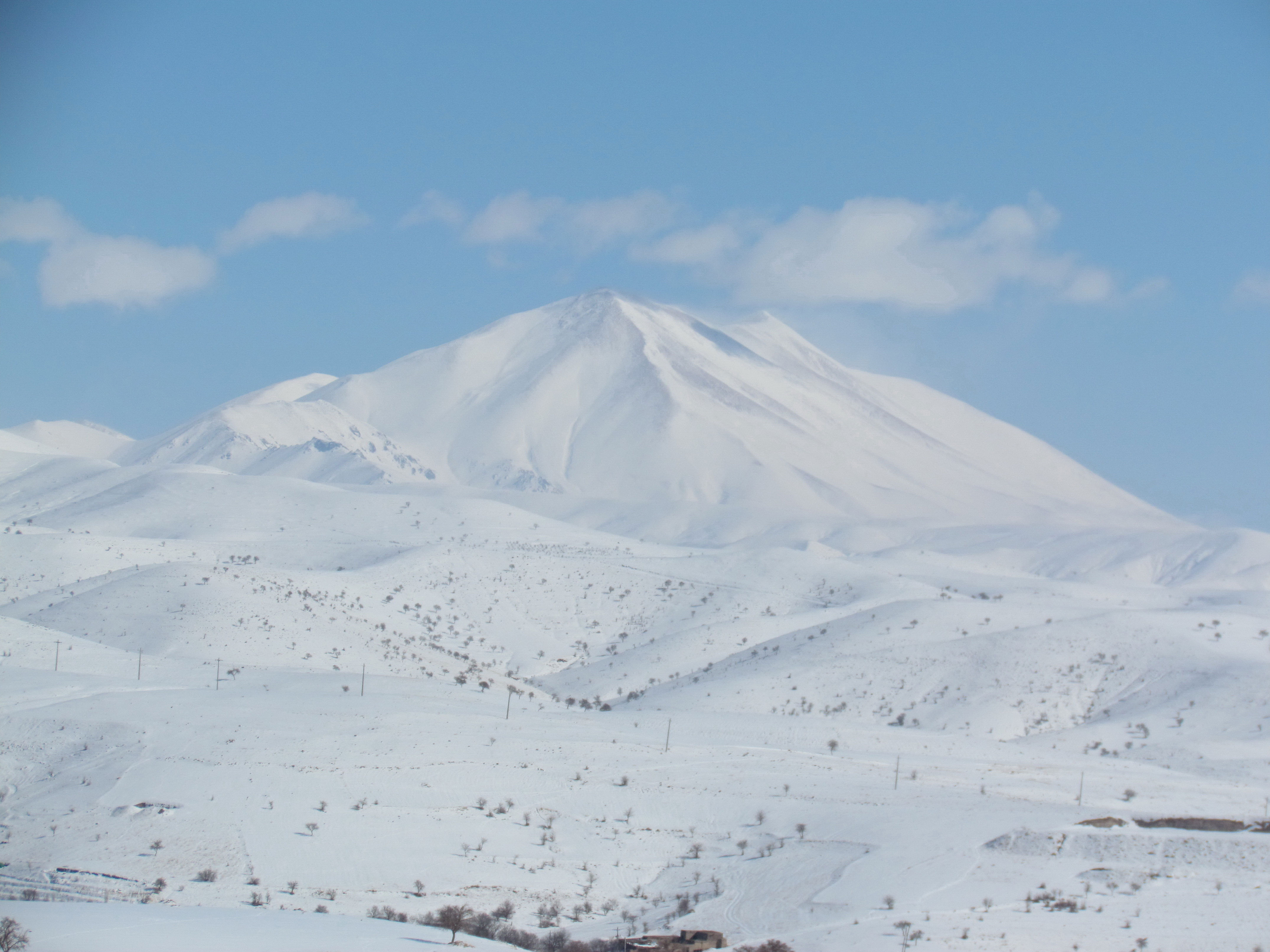

Highest point
- Elevation: 3,707 m (12,162 ft)
- Prominence: 1,826 m (5,991 ft)
- Listing: Ultra
- Coordinates: 37°43′51″N 46°30′00″E

Geography
- Location within Iran
- Location: East Azarbaijan, Iran

Geology
- Rock age: 12–0.14 million years
- Mountain type: Stratovolcano
- Last eruption: Unknown

Sahand (Persian: سهند), is a massive, heavily eroded stratovolcano in East Azerbaijan Province, northwestern Iran. At 3,707 m (12,162 ft), it is the highest mountain in the province of East Azerbaijan.

Sahand is one of the highest mountains in Iranian Azerbaijan, in addition to being an important dormant volcano in the country. The Sahand mountains are directly south of Tabriz, the highest peak of which is Kamal at an elevation of 3,707 m (12,162 ft). Approximately 17 peaks can be accounted for as being over 3,000 m (9,843 ft) in height. Due to the presence of a variety of flora and fauna, the Sahand mountains are known as the bride of mountains in Iran. Sahand is made chiefly of dacite and associated felsic rocks.

== Winter sports ==
Sahand Ski Resort is on the northern foothills of the mountain and near the city of Tabriz.

== Name ==
Iranian naval ships have been named for it including IRIS Sahand (1969) and IRIS Sahand (2012) (74).

== See also ==
- List of volcanoes in Iran
- Sahand University of Technology
- List of ultras of West Asia
- Kandovan rock dwellings
