= Mount Paraw =

Mountain in Iran

Parâw
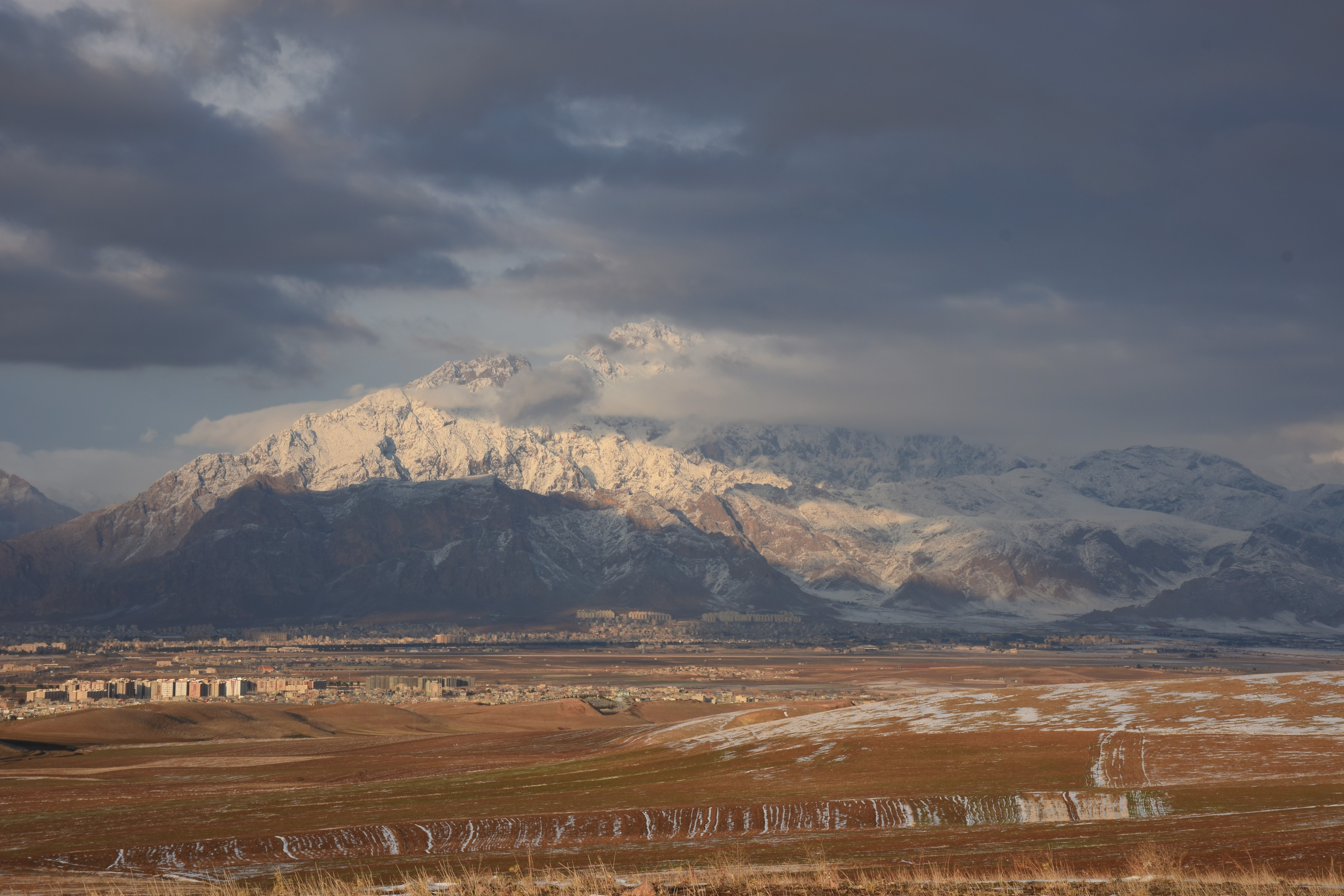
- View of Parâw covered with snow from the top of Mount Meywala

Highest point
- Elevation: 3,390 m (11,120 ft)
- Listing: Three thousanders
- Coordinates: 34°23′31″N 47°14′13″E

Geography
- Location within Iran
- Location: NE Kermanshah, Kermanshah province
- Parent range: Zagros

Climbing
- First ascent: 1970 by an English exploration team
- Easiest route: Chalabeh village

Parâw (Kurdish: په‌ڕاو, lit. 'Full of Water', Persian: پراو) is a mountain located to the north east of Kermanshah city in western Iran. Parâw, with an approximate length of 80 km and an area of 880 square kilometres is part of the Zagros Mountains. Paraw is one of the 1515 Ultra-prominent peak of the world.

== Geology ==
The mountain was uplifted during the Tertiary geological period. Subsequently, in the Quaternary period, it assumed its present form. The composition of its rocks is mainly sedimentary and limestone. This has caused numerous caves and wells to be formed by erosion on the mountain.

== Highest cave ==
Paraw cave or Ghar Parau is located at 3050 metres above sea level which is the highest cave in the world and well known as the Everest of world caves. this cave has a 751-meter depth and with D5 degree of difficulty recognized as one of hardest caves for caving. The British caving team which discovered the cave gave it the name of Ghar Parau. Five professional cavers have died in this cave.

== Deepest cave of Asia ==
Jujar is the deepest cave in Asia and is located on the eastern face of Paraw. On 7 September 2015, Jujar cave was recognized as the deepest cave in Iran. An Iranian caving team consisting of 24 athletes discovered 806 meter and 8 centimeter of this cave. Before this achievement Paraw cave (also located on the mountain) was the deepest cave of Iran. In August 2016, an international expedition started to explore the whole of the cave. eventually they announced that they had successfully reached a depth of more than 1000 meters into the cave, thus Jujar became the deepest cave of Asia and Iran.

== Second deep natural well ==
Ghala cave is a natural well located in outrace of Paraw. It reachesa depth of 559.6 meters and has been recognized as the second deepest natural well in the world.

== See also ==
- List of ultras of West Asia
