= Qaleh gorikhteh =

Qal'eh gorikhteh
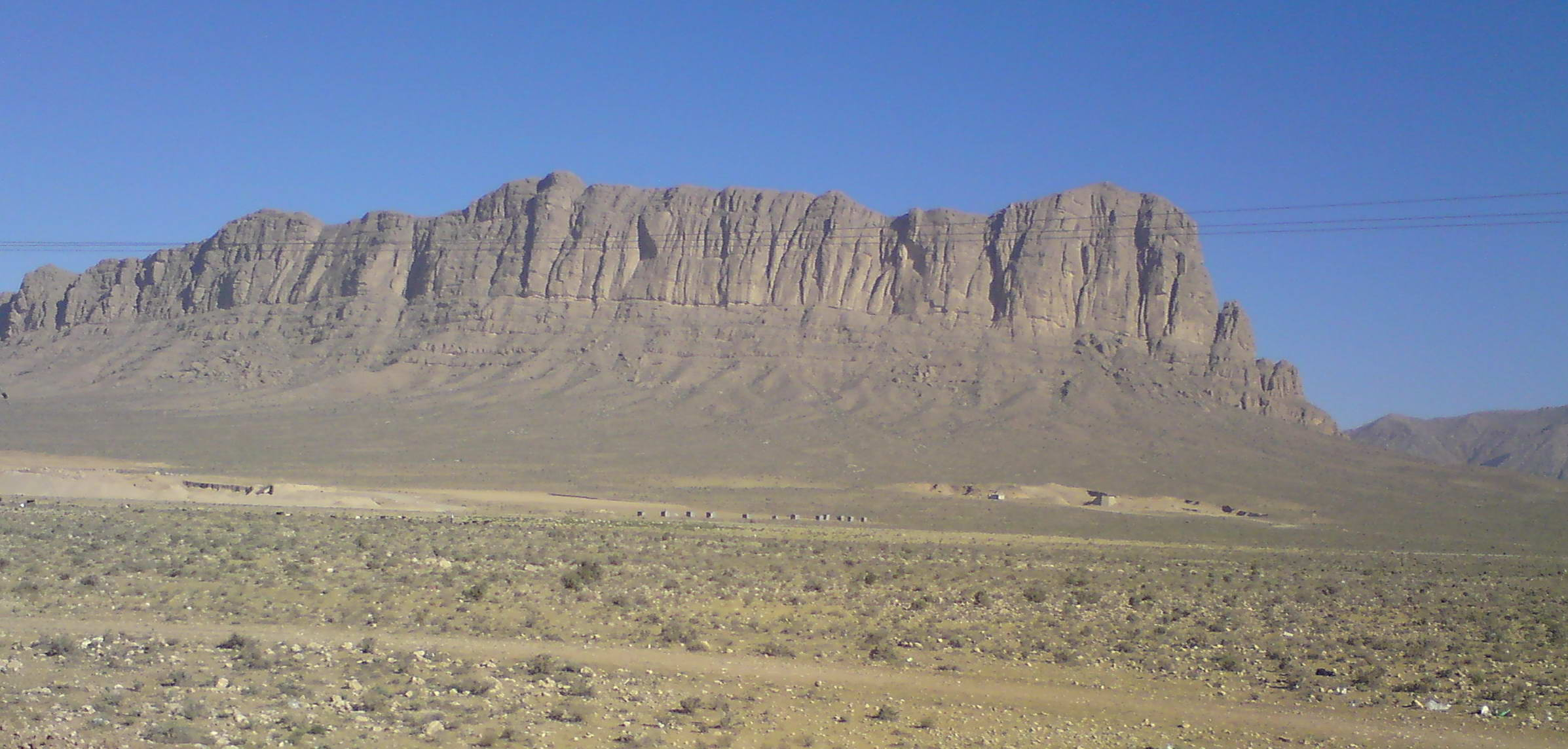

Highest point
- Elevation: 1,934 m (6,345 ft)
- Coordinates: 29°18′08.7″N 53°03′18.14″E

Geography
- Location within Iran
- Location: Sarvestan, Fars, Iran
- Parent range: Zagros

Geology
- Rock age: Old
- Mountain type: Igneous

Qal'eh gorikhteh (Persian: قلعه گریخته, meaning "fled castle") is one of the Zagros Mountains, which are 6 km northwest of the town of Sarvestan, in the Fars province. It derives its name from its unique shape and from how it is falling apart from the main string of mountains.

== See also ==
- List of mountains in Iran
- List of volcanoes in Iran
- Lists of volcanoes
- Volcanic Seven Summits
- List of ultras of West Asia
- List of mountain peaks by prominence
