= Qandil Mountains =

Subrange of the Zagros mountains in Kurdistan

- چیاکانی قەندیل; Romanization: Çiyakanî Qendîl
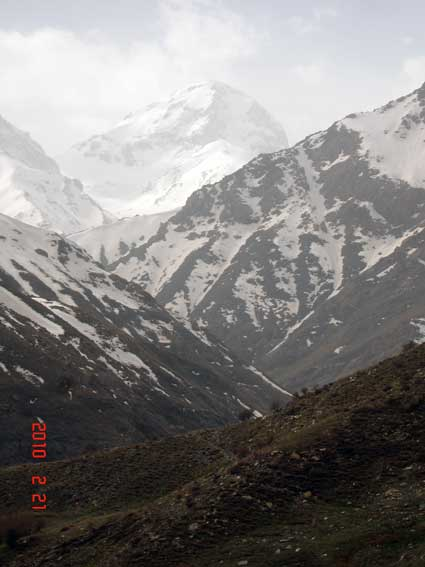

Highest point
- Elevation: 3,587 metres (11,768 ft)
- Coordinates: 36°32′28″N 44°59′46″E

Dimensions
- Area: 50 km^{2} (19 mi^{2})

Naming
- Etymology: Qand (sugar, in Kurdish)
- Native name: چیایێن قەندیلێ (Çiyayên Qendîlê) (Kurdish)

Geography
- Location within Iraq
- Country: Iraq
- Governate: Erbil
- Region: Kurdistan
- Parent range: Zagros
- Borders on: Iran

Geology
- Orogeny: Zagros fold and thrust belt

The Qandil Mountains (Kurdish: چیایێن قەندیلێ, romanized: Çiyayên Qendîlê or چیاکانی قەندیل, Çiyakanî Qendîl), are a mountainous area of Iraqi Kurdistan near the Iranian and Turkish borders. The region belongs to the Zagros mountain range and is difficult to access, with extremely rugged terrain. The highest peaks reach over 3,000m.

The area is notable as a sanctuary and headquarters for the Kurdistan Workers' Party (PKK). Approximately 5,000 PKK and other armed Kurdish factions control an area of roughly 50 km², which has been sporadically bombarded by the Turkish Air Force and shelled by Iranian military artillery for several years. The Kurdistan Free Life Party (PJAK) is also based in the Qandil Mountains, which allows them to infiltrate into Iran. In 1967, the Democratic Party of Iranian Kurdistan (PDKI) attacked the Pahlavi regime to regain autonomy in Iran, ultimately failing and fleeing to the Qandil Mountains, remaining underground until 1971. The Qandil Mountains were the headquarters of the PDKI from 1968-1993 where the Iranian regime attacked several military camps during the 1979 Kurdish rebellion in Iran and the KDPI insurgency (1989–1996).

== See also ==
- Kuhe Haji Ebrahim (highest peak)
- 1967 Kurdish revolt in Iran
- Democratic Party of Iranian Kurdistan
