= Garrin Mountain =

Mountain in Iran

- Kuh-e Garin
- Location within Iran

Highest point
- Elevation: 3,630 m (11,910 ft)
- Prominence: 1,780 m (5,840 ft)
- Listing: Ultra
- Coordinates: 33°57′33″N 48°28′54″E

Geography
- Location: Lorestan province, Iran
- Parent range: Zagros Mountains

Garrin Mountain (Persian: کوه گرین, romanized: Kuh-e Garin) is a vast high-elevated mountain of the Zagros Mountains, located in the provinces of Hamedan and Lorestan in western Iran.

Garrin is limited to Borujerd from the east, to Alashtar from the west, and to Nahavand from the north. It has several peaks 3,000+ meters above sea level. Of these, Velash Peak is the highest at 3,630 metres (11,910 ft).

== See also ==
- List of ultras of West Asia
