= Oshtorankuh =

Ultra-prominent ridge-shape mountain in Iran, Zagros mountain range

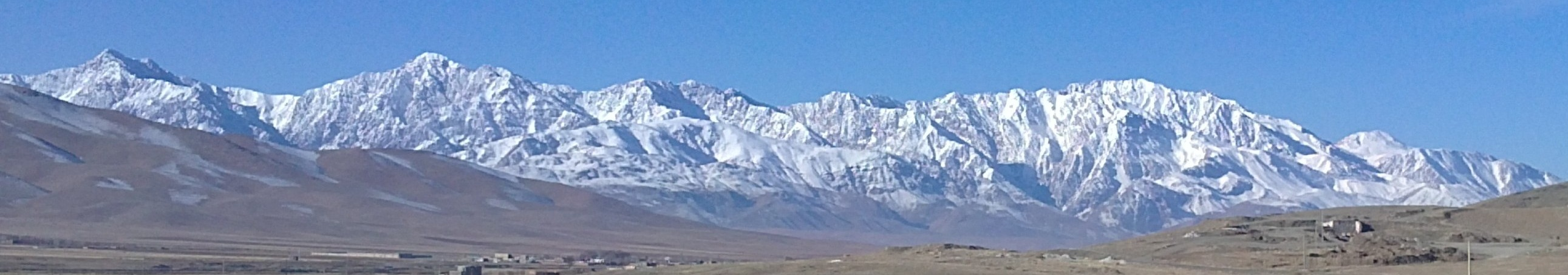
- View of Oshtorankuh

Highest point
- Elevation: 4,050 m (13,290 ft)
- Coordinates: 33°20′25″N 49°18′16″E

Naming
- Etymology: "Mountain of camels"
- Native name: اشترانکوه

Geography
- Location within Iran
- Location: Azna, لرستان province, Iran
- Country: Iran
- Province: Lorestan
- Parent range: Zagros Mountains

Geology
- Rock type: Jurassic-Cretaceous dolomitic limestone

Climbing
- Easiest route: Hiking

Oshtorankuh (Persian: اشترانکوه) is a mountain located in city of Azna, in Lorestan province of western Iran.

Oshtorankuh means “mountain of camels” in Persian and is made of two words, “oshtoran” which is the plural form of ”oshtor” or “shotor” meaning “camel” with the plural suffix “an” and “kuh” that means “mountain”. So because of its eight high peaks of more than 4000 metres that look like a caravan of camels, this mountain is called “Oshtorkuh” or “Oshtorankuh”.

Situated in the Lorestan geologic and structural zone of Iran, the Oshtorankuh is mainly made of Jurassic-Cretaceous dolomitic limestone. Being a high mountain with snow-covered peaks and glacial valleys, the Oshtorankuh has a cold mountain climate with cold winters and cool summers.

Mountain pistachio, rhubarb, goat's thorn and wild plants are among the various forms of the mountain's vegetation. Animals include brown bears, foxes, grey wolves, boars, hyenas, squirrels, wild cats and mountain goats. Eagles, quails, and owls are among different birds found in the vicinity of this mountain. Gahar Lake is within this protected region. The Dez Dam starts in the Zagros mountains near the Oshtorankuh.

== See also ==
- List of ultras of West Asia
