= Kuh-e Haji Ebrahim =

Mountain on the Iran–Iraq border

Kuhe Haji Ebrahim کوه حاجی ابراهیم
- Location within Iraq

Highest point
- Elevation: 3,587 m (11,768 ft)
- Prominence: 1,747 m (5,732 ft)
- Listing: Ultra
- Coordinates: 36°33′N 45°00′E

Geography
- Location: Kurdistan border
- Parent range: Zagros Mountains

Kuh-e Haji Ebrahim (Kurdish: شاخی حاجی ئیبراهیم, Persian: کوه حاجی ابراهیم) is a mountain of the Qandil Mountains, a subrange of the Zagros Mountains. The peak is located in Borders of Parts of Kurdistan in western Asia.

Haji Ebrahim has an elevation of 3,587 metres (11,768 ft) and sits on the international Greater Kurdistan.

== See also ==
- Zagros Mountains topics
- List of ultras of West Asia
