= List of ultras of West Asia =

This is a list of all 101 of the ultra-prominent peaks (with topographic prominence greater than 1,500 metres) in West Asia. It includes peaks on the islands of Cyprus and Socotra. It also includes the 10 ultras of the Caucasus (also listed under Europe) as they are also geographically connected to the mountains of West Asia. Two of these peaks (Mount Aragats and Kapudzhukh Lerr) are on the Asian side of the ridge of the Greater Caucasus, which forms the boundary between Asia and Europe, and four more are on the border itself and so in both Europe and Asia.

== List ==
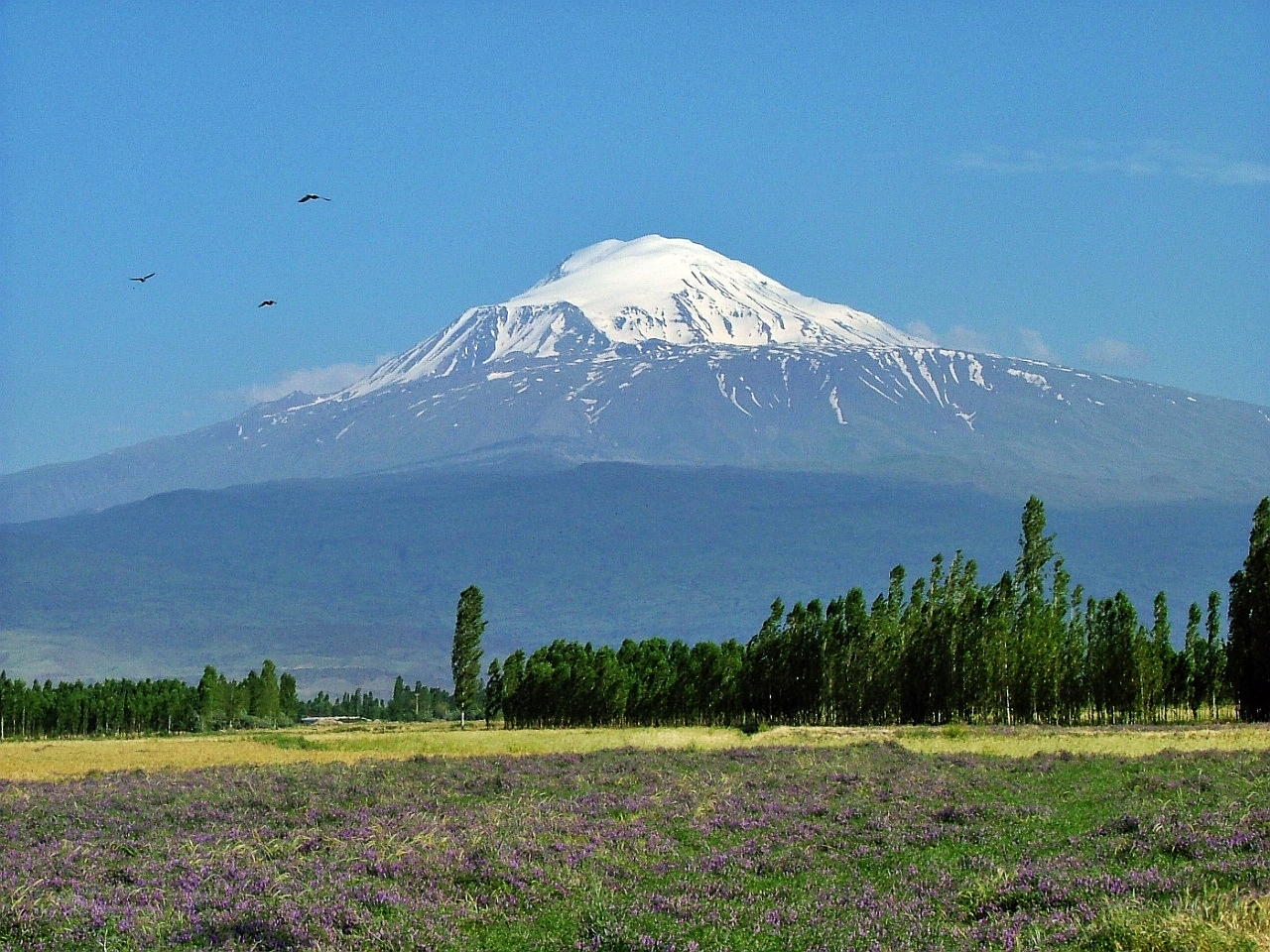
Mount Ararat, Turkey

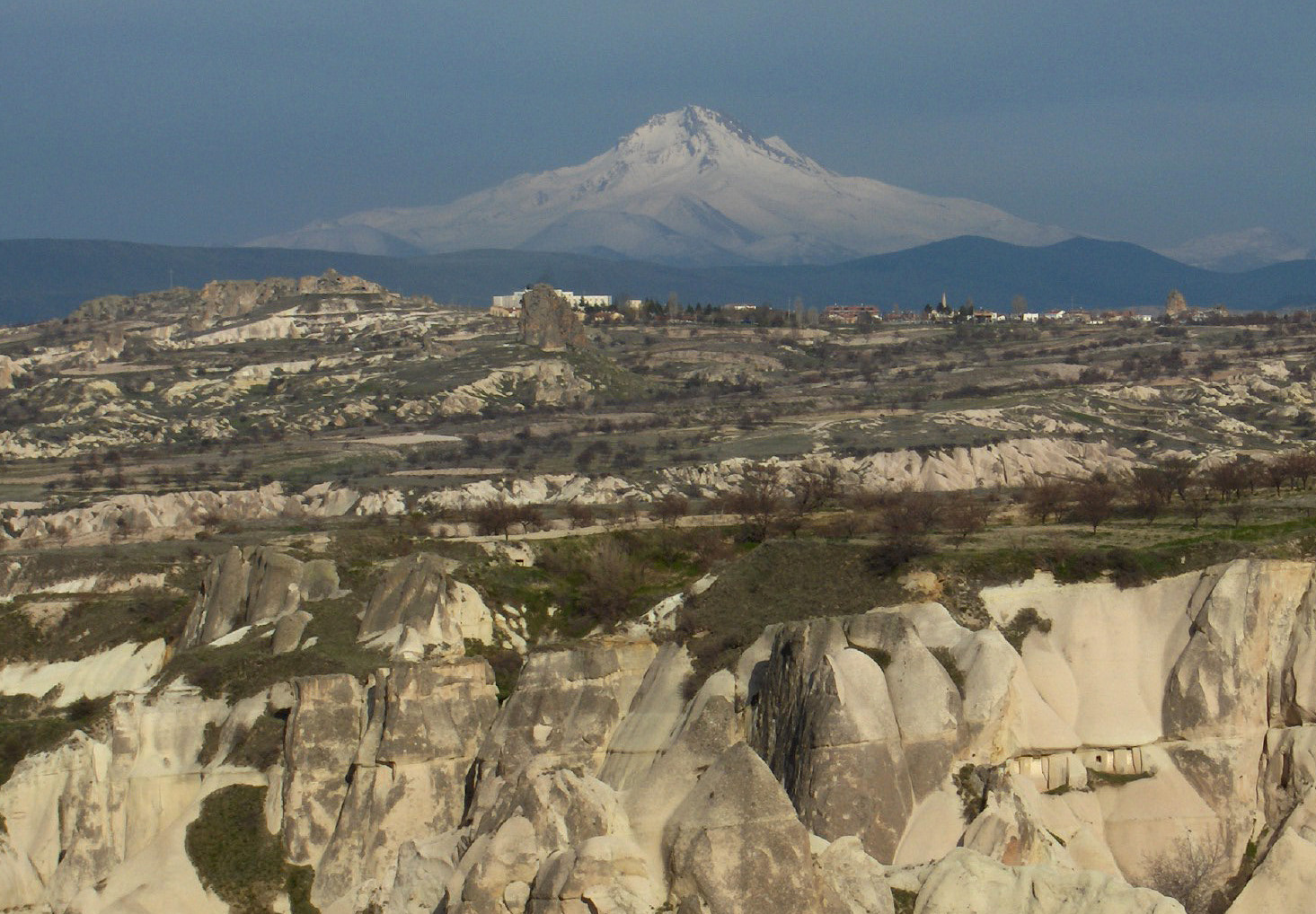
Mount Erciyes, Turkey

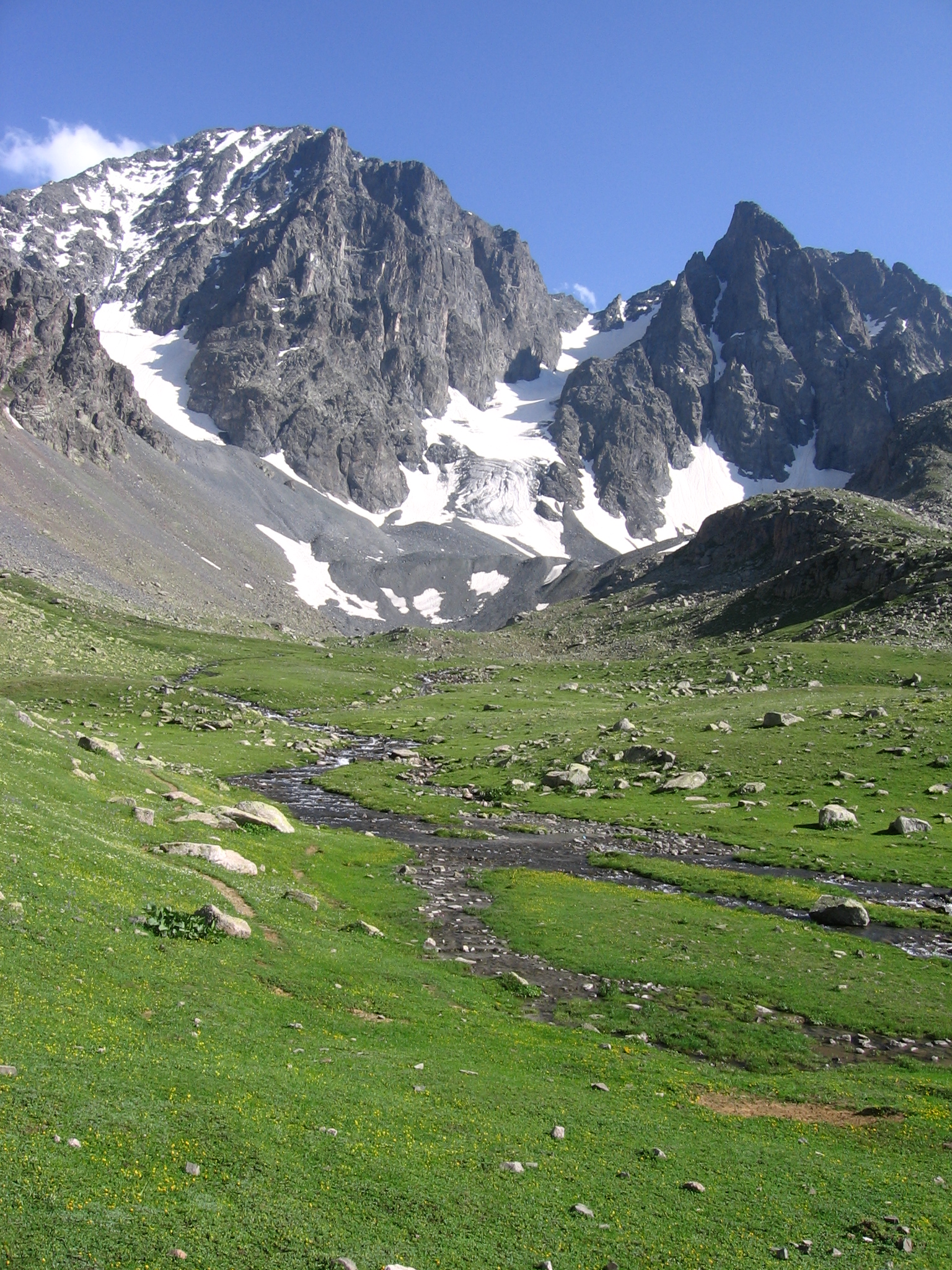
Kaçkar Mountains, Turkey

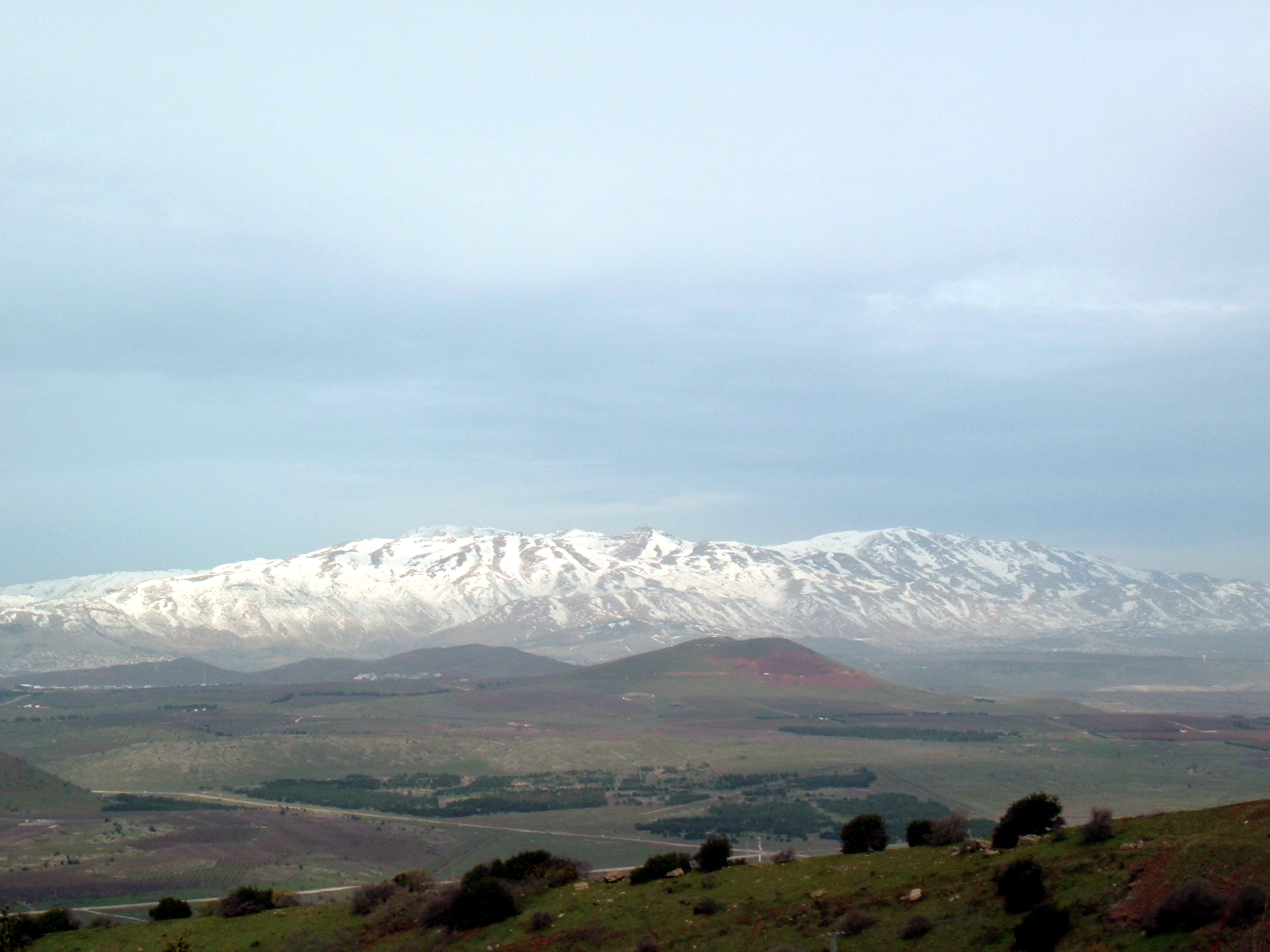
Mount Hermon, Syria

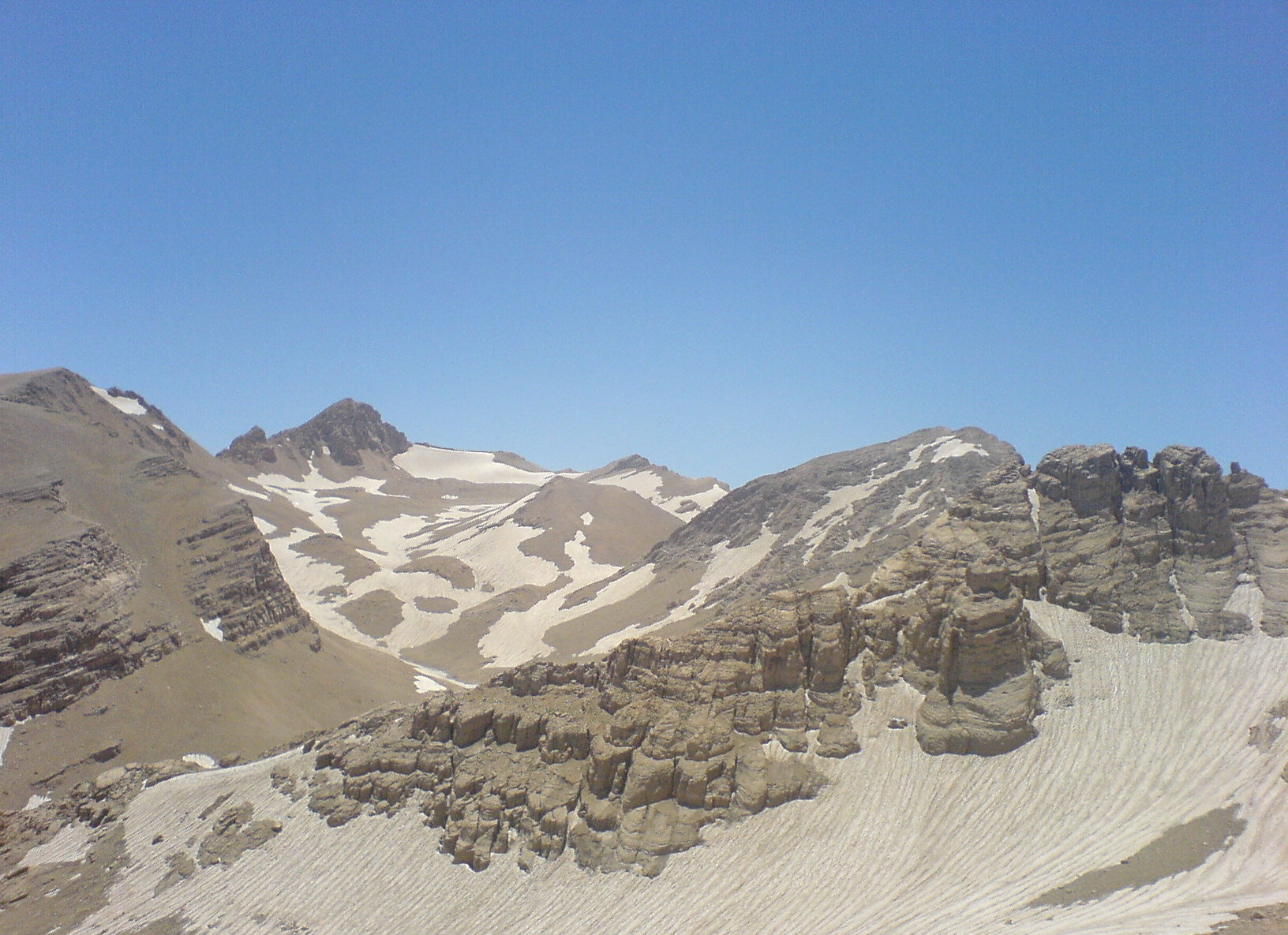
Zard Kuh, Iran

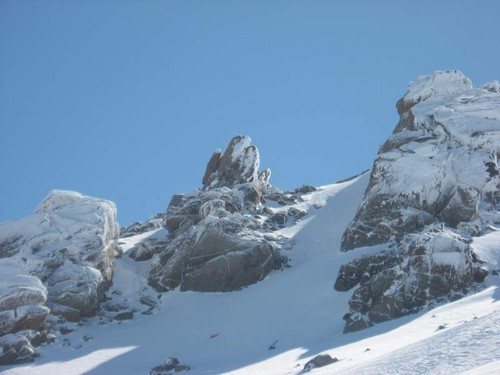
Alvand, Iran

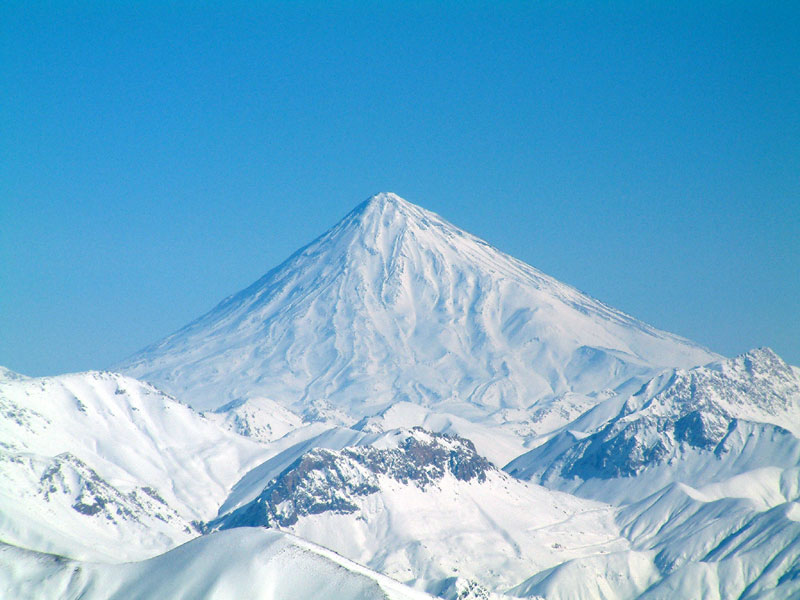
Mount Damavand, Iran

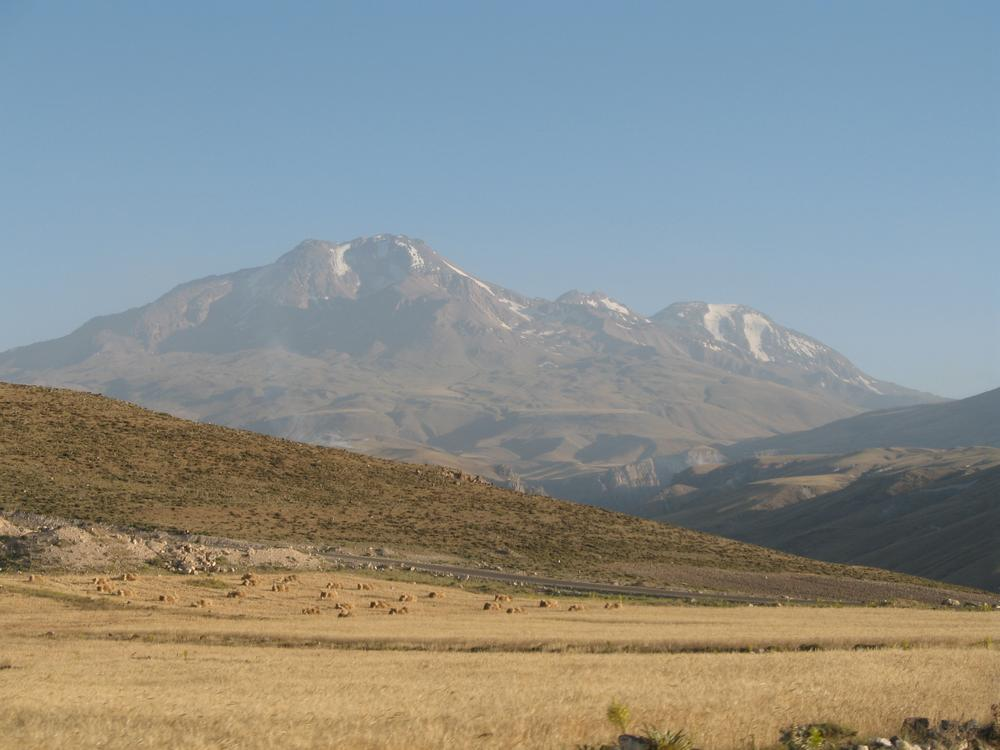
Sabalan, Iran

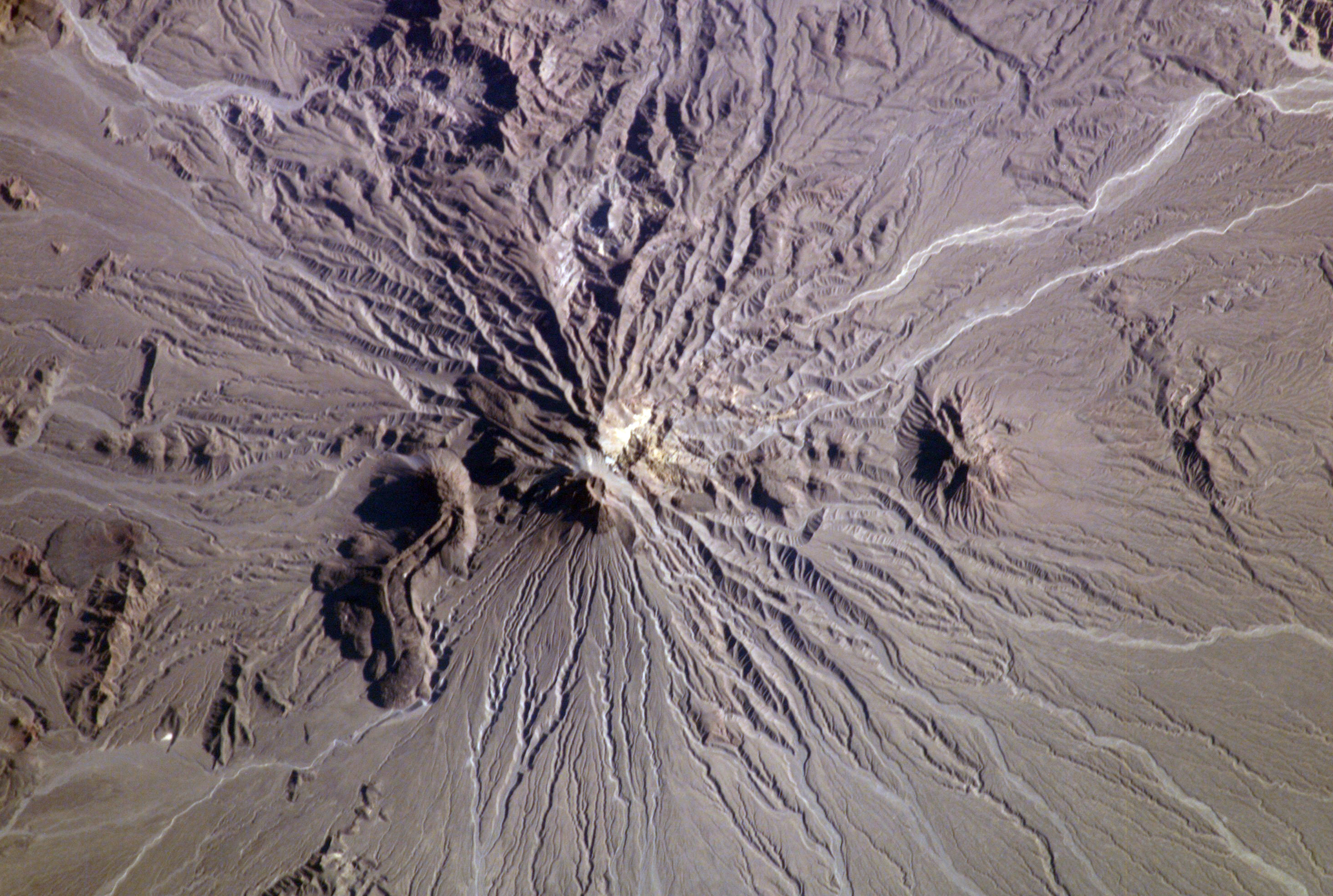
Bazman, Iran

No	Peak	Elevation (m)	Prominence (m)	Country	Range	Col (m)	Notes
1 Turkey							
1.01	Mount Ararat	5,137	3,611	Turkey	Armenian Highlands	1526	
1.02	Uludoruk (Resko Tepe)	4,136	2,483	Turkey	Zagros Mountains	1653	
1.03	Mount Erciyes	3,917	2,419	Turkey	Central Anatolia	1498	
1.04	Demirkazik Tepe	3,756	2,336	Turkey	Taurus Mountains	1420	
1.05	Kaçkar Dağı	3,932	2,272	Turkey	Pontic Mountains	1660	
1.06	Mount Süphan	4,058	2,189	Turkey	Armenian Highlands	1869	
1.07	Medetsiz Tepe	3,524	2,058	Turkey	Taurus Mountains	1466	
1.08	Bey Daglari	3,070	1,966	Turkey	South West Anatolia	1104	
1.09	Mount Hasan	3,268	1,922	Turkey	Central Anatolia	1346	
1.10	Mor Dagi	3,800	1,805	Turkey	Zagros Mountains	1995	
1.11	Babadağ	1,969	1,763	Turkey	South West Anatolia	206	
1.12	Samdi Dag	3,811	1,729	Turkey	Zagros Mountains	2082	
1.13	Uyluk Tepe	3,016	1,664	Turkey	South West Anatolia	1352	
1.14	Dedegol Tepesi	2,980	1,657	Turkey	Taurus Mountains	1323	
1.15	Boz Dag	2,156	1,579	Turkey	Western Anatolia	577	
1.16	Barla Dagi	2,800	1,574	Turkey	Taurus Mountains	1226	
1.17	Kesis Dagi	3,546	1,559	Turkey	Pontic Mountains	1987	
1.18	Davraz Tepe	2,635	1,553	Turkey	Taurus Mountains	1082	
1.19	Killi Tepe	3,075	1,547	Turkey	Taurus Mountains	1528	
1.20	Ilgaz Daglari	2,587	1,544	Turkey	Pontic Mountains	1043	
1.21	Geyik Daglari	2,877	1,543	Turkey	Taurus Mountains	1334	
1.22	Akbaba Tepesi	3,457	1,509	Turkey	Pontic Mountains	1948	
1.23	Uludağ	2,543	1,504	Turkey	Western Anatolia	1039	
2 Arabia, Levant and Cyprus							
2.01	Jabal An-Nabi Shu'ayb	3,666	3,326	Yemen	Arabian Highlands	340	
2.02	Jebel Shams	3,019	2,899	Oman	Al Hajar Mountains	120	
2.03	Mount Catherine	2,629	2,404	Egypt	Sinai	225	
2.04	Qurnat as Sawda'	3,088	2,392	Lebanon	Lebanon	695	
2.05	Mount Olympus	1,952	1,952	Cyprus	Cyprus	0	
2.06	Mount Hermon	2,814	1,804	Syria/Lebanon	Anti-Lebanon	1010	
2.07	Jebel al Harim	2,087	1,727	Oman	Al Hajar Mountains	360	
2.08	Jebel Kawr	2,730	1,718	Oman	Al Hajar Mountains	1012	
2.09	Jebel Jar	2,300	1,709	Saudi Arabia	Arabian Highlands	591	
2.10	Jebel Raymah	2,920	1,635	Yemen	Arabian Highlands	1285	
2.11	Jabal al-Lawz	2,580	1,622	Saudi Arabia	Arabian Highlands	958	
2.12	Jebel Khadar	2,200	1,600	Oman	Al Hajar Mountains	600	
2.13	Jabal Sabir	3,006	1,586	Yemen	Arabian Highlands	1420	
2.14	Hajhir	1,505	1,505	Yemen	Socotra	0	
3 Iran							
3.01	Mount Damavand	5,610	4,667	Iran	Alborz Mountains	943	
3.02	Sabalan	4,811	3,283	Iran	Lesser Caucasus	1528	
3.03	Taftan Volcano	3,941	2,901	Iran	Eastern Iran	1040	
3.04	Hazaran	4,500	2,741	Iran	Hazaran	1759	
3.05	Dena	4,409	2,604	Iran	Zagros Mountains	1805	
3.06	Bazman	3,503	2,400	Iran	Eastern Iran	1103	
3.07	Shir Kuh	4,050	2,271	Iran	Iranian plateau	1779	
3.08	Kuh-e Shab	2,681	2,100	Iran	Zagros Mountains	581	
3.09	Zard Kuh	4,221	2,095	Iran	Zagros Mountains	2105	
3.10	Mount Paraw	3390	2083	Iran	Zagros Mountains	1322	
3.11	Kuh-e Fareghan	3,240	2,082	Iran	Zagros Mountains	1158	
3.12	Kuh-e Siah Khvani	3,314	2074	Iran	Alborz Mountains	1444	
3.13	Kuh-e Genu	2,350	2,035	Iran	Zagros Mountains	315	
3.14	Oshtorankuh	4,139	1,986	Iran	Zagros Mountains	2153	
3.15	Kuh-e Palvar	4,229	1,970	Iran	Hazaran	2259	
3.16	Kuh-e Nay Band	2,960	1,968	Iran	Iranian plateau	992	
3.17	Khvoshkuh	2,650	1,967	Iran	Zagros Mountains	683	
3.18	Kuh-e Hami	3,190	1,944	Iran	Zagros Mountains	1246	
3.19	Kuh-e Shahvar	3,890	1,881	Iran	Alborz Mountains	2009	
3.20	HP Eshdeger Range	2,920	1,830	Iran	Eastern Iran	1103	
3.21	Alam Kuh	4,805	1,827	Iran	Alborz Mountains	2978	
3.22	Sahand	3,707	1,826	Iran	Azerbaijan Mountains	1881	
3.23	Garrin Mountain	3,630	1,780	Iran	Zagros Mountains	1850	
3.24	Kuhha-ye Hezar Masjed	3,120	1,760	Iran	Alborz Mountains	1360	
3.25	Kuh-e Khabr	3,856	1,758	Iran	Zagros Mountains	2098	
3.26	Kuhe Haji Ebrahim	3,587	1,747	Iraq / Iran	Zagros Mountains	1840	
3.27	Kuh-e Kharanaq	3,150	1,732	Iran	Iranian plateau	1418	
3.28	Kuh-e Shahu	3,350	1,714	Iran	Zagros Mountains	1636	
3.29	Kuh-e Gar	2,950	1,710	Iran	Alborz Mountains	1240	
3.30	Kuh-e Karkas	3,870	1,698	Iran	Iranian plateau	2172	
3.31	Kuh-kansifi	3,065	1,697	Iran	Zagros Mountains	1792	
3.32	Mila Kuh	2,888	1,686	Iran	Eastern Iran	1202	
3.33	Kuh-e Takht	2,975	1,675	Iran	Zagros Mountains	1300	
3.34	Kuh-e Mirza 'Arab	2,887	1,657	Iran	Eastern Iran	1230	
3.35	Alvand	3,570	1,654	Iran	Zagros Mountains	1916	
3.36	Kuh-e Bagh-e Bala	3,775	1,635	Iran	Hazaran	2140	
3.37	Kuh-e Aq Dagh	3,321	1,625	Iran	Alborz Mountains	1696	
3.38	Kuh-e Hezar Darreh	3,880	1,620	Iran	Zagros Mountains	2260	
3.39	Kuh-e Rag	3,661	1,609	Iran	Zagros Mountains	2052	
3.40	Kuh-e Namak	2,846	1,601	Iran	Zagros Mountains	1245	
3.41	Kuh-e Jupar	4,150	1,597	Iran	Hazaran	2553	
3.42	Kuh-e Mohammadabad	3,592	1,585	Iran	Iranian plateau	2007	
3.43	Cheekha Dar	3,611	1,575	Iraq / Iran	Zagros Mountains	2036	
3.44	Kuh-e Ja'in	2,980	1,572	Iran	Zagros Mountains	1408	
3.45	Kuh-e Bul	3,943	1,563	Iran	Zagros Mountains	2380	
3.46	Molkooh	2,958	1,560	Iran	Eastern Iran	1398	
3.47	Kuh-e Gereh	3,990	1,557	Iran	Zagros Mountains	2433	
3.48	Kuh-e Denband	2,777	1,539	Iran	Iranian plateau	1238	
3.49	Geli Kuh	2,995	1,534	Iran	Eastern Iran	1461	
3.50	Kuh-e Par-e Lavar	2,209	1,530	Iran	Zagros Mountains	679	
3.51	Kuh-e Nozva	3,730	1,510	Iran	Alborz Mountains	2220	
3.52	Kuh-e Menar	3,750	1,510	Iran	Zagros Mountains	2240	
3.53	Kuh-e Raziyeh	3,120	1,510	Iran	Zagros Mountains	1610	
3.54	Kuh-e Patu	3,070	1,509	Iran	Alborz Mountains	1561	
3.55	Kiyamaki Dagh	3,358	1,500	Iran	Lesser Caucasus	1858	
4 Caucasus							
4.01	Mount Elbrus	5,642	4,741	Russia	Greater Caucasus	901	
4.02	Mount Bazarduzu	4,466	2,454	Russia / Azerbaijan	Greater Caucasus	2012	
4.03	Mount Kazbek	5,034	2,353	Russia / Georgia	Greater Caucasus	2681	
4.04	Tebulosmta	4,493	2,145	Russia / Georgia	Greater Caucasus	2348	
4.05	Mount Aragats	4,090	2,143	Armenia	Lesser Caucasus	1947	
4.06	Dykh-Tau	5,205	2,002	Russia	Greater Caucasus	3203	
4.07	Dyultydag	4,127	1,834	Russia	Greater Caucasus	2293	
4.08	Kapudzhukh Lerr	3,905	1,820	Armenia / Azerbaijan	Lesser Caucasus	2085	
4.09	Gora Addala Shukgelmezr	4,152	1,792	Russia	Greater Caucasus	2360	
4.10	Gora Shan	4,451	1,775	Russia / Georgia	Greater Caucasus	2676	

== See also ==
- List of Iranian four-thousanders

== Sources ==
- List - Turkey
- List - Arabia
- List - Iran
- Map - Turkey & Iran
- Map - Arabia
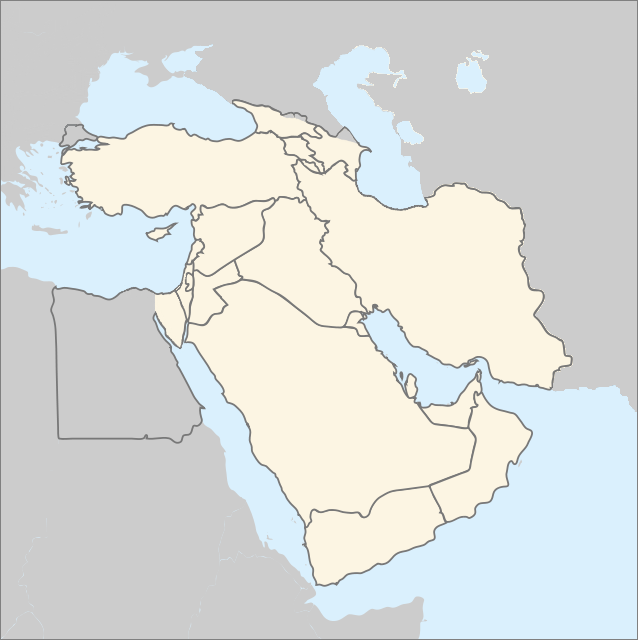
