= Mount Arbaba =

Arbaba, Arbeba, Erbeba
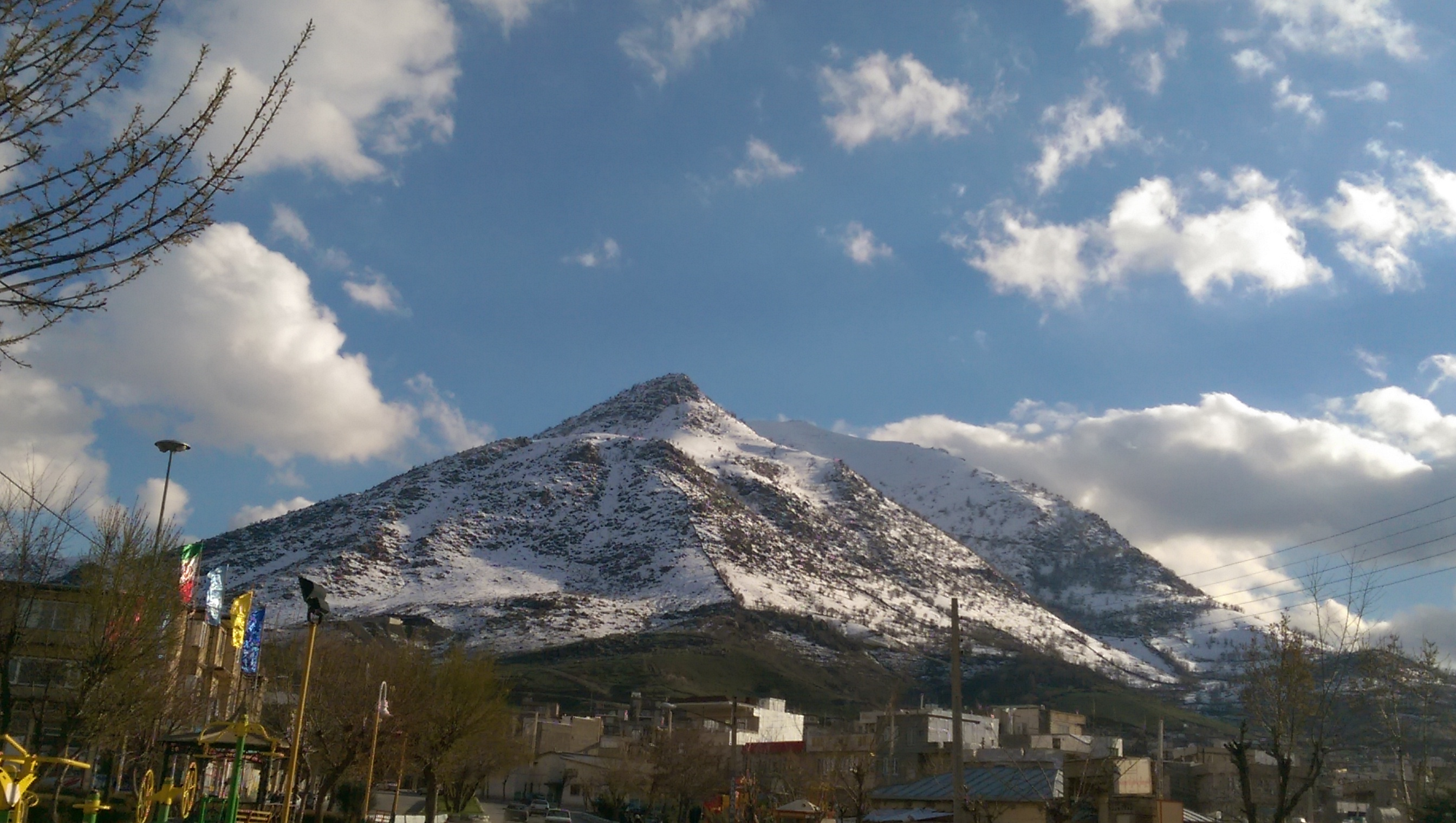

Geography

Mount Arbaba (Arbeba, Erbeba, ئاربه‌با) is a mountain of near the city of Baneh, in the Zagros Mountain range in Kurdistan Province of western Iran. It is in the Iranian Kurdistan region.

The mountain has an elevation of approximately 2,210 metres (7,251 ft) and a prominence of about 586 metres (1,923 ft).
