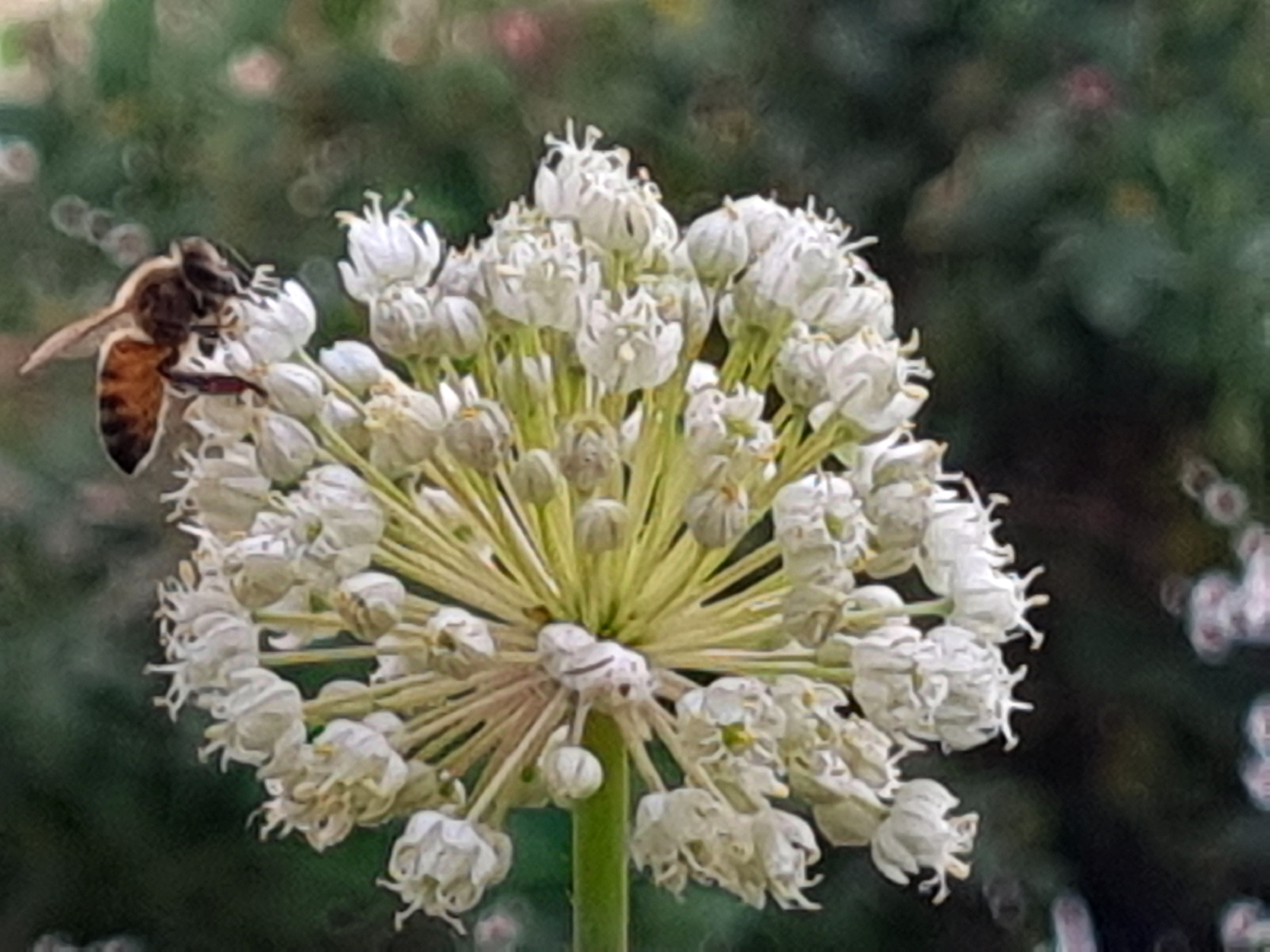
- Flower of Allium iranicum

Scientific classification
- Kingdom: Plantae
- Clade: Tracheophytes
- Clade: Angiosperms
- Clade: Monocots
- Order: Asparagales
- Family: Amaryllidaceae
- Subfamily: Allioideae
- Genus: Allium
- Subgenus: A. subg. Allium
- Species: A. iranicum

Binomial name
- Allium iranicum (Wendelbo) Wendelbo

Synonyms
- Allium ampeloprasum subsp. iranicum Wendelbo

= Allium iranicum =

Species of flowering plant

Allium iranicum or Afghan leek or Iranian leek is a species of wild leek native to the Zagros Mountains of Iran and northern Iraq. It is used in Iranian traditional medicine as a treatment for hemorrhoids. Its chromosome number is 2n=32.

Adding Allium iranicum to yogurt results in increasing the quality and thickness.
