= Kashku, Hormozgan =

Kashku كشكو
- Village
- Location within Iran
- Coordinates: 27°25′23″N 56°46′28″E
- Country: Iran
- Province: Hormozgan
- County: Bandar Abbas
- Bakhsh: Takht
- Rural District: Shamil

Population (2006)
  - Total: 1,118
- Time zone: UTC+3:30 (IRST)
  - Summer (DST): UTC+4:30 (IRDT)

Kashku (Persian: كشكو, also Romanized as Kashkū; also known as Kashkū’īyeh, Kashkuyeh, Khushku, and Khvoshkūh) is a village in Shamil Rural District, Takht District, Bandar Abbas County, Hormozgan Province, Iran. At the 2006 census, its population was 1,118, in 255 families.

== See also ==
- List of ultras of West Asia
