= Zard-Kuh =

Sub-range in the central Zagros Mountains, Iran

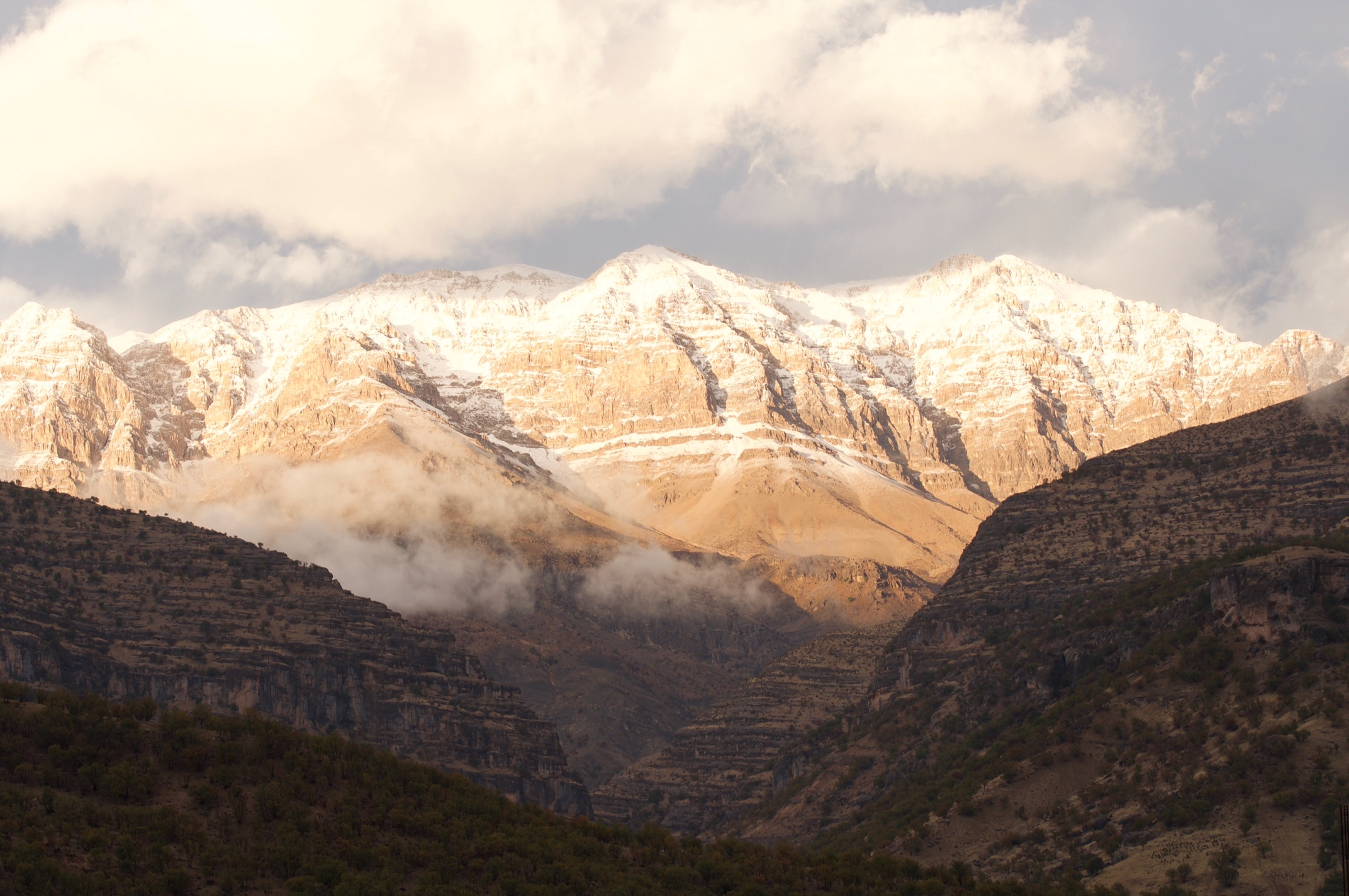

Highest point
- Elevation: 4,221 m (13,848 ft)
- Prominence: 2,095 m (6,873 ft)
- Listing: Ultra
- Coordinates: 32°21′52″N 50°4′39″E

Naming
- Native name: زردکوه (Persian)
- English translation: Yellow Mountain

Geography
- Location within Iran
- Location: Iran
- Parent range: Zagros Mountains

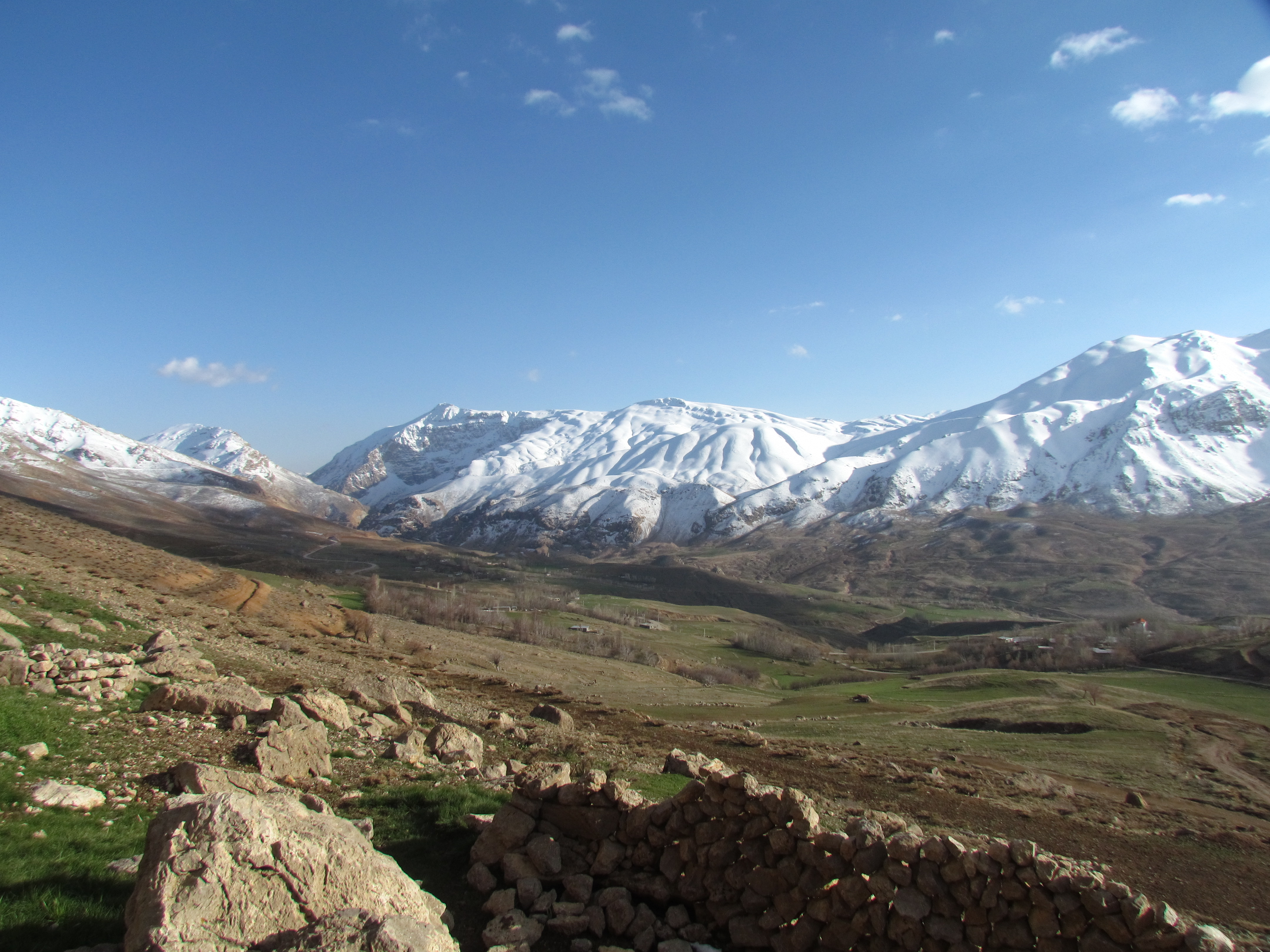

Zard-Kuh, also Zard Kuh-e Bakhtiari (Persian: زردکوه بختیاری, lit. 'Bakhtiari Yellow Mountain', alternatively Zardkuh or Zarduh Kuh), is a sub-range in the central Zagros Mountains, Iran.

With an elevation of 4,221 metres (13,848 ft), its highest peak "Kolonchin" is located in the Kuhrang County, in the Chaharmahal and Bakhtiari province of Iran. The Karun and also Zayanderud rivers originate in the Zagros Mountains near the Zard-Kuh. There are small glaciers on the mountain owing to the relatively high precipitation, which are the only glaciers in the subtropics outside the Himalayas, Andes and Trans-Mexican Volcanic Belt.

Geologically, the Zard-Kuh is situated in the Sanandaj-Sirjan geologic and structural zone of Iran and is mainly made of Cretaceous limestone.

The documentary Grass captures on film the Bakhtiari tribe's crossing of Zard-Kuh.

== See also ==
- List of ultras of West Asia
