= Gardaneh ye Kuli Kash =

Mountains in Iran

Gardaneh-ye Kuli Kesh or Kush
- (Persian: گَردَنِۀ كُولی كُش)
- Interactive map of Gardaneh-ye Kuli Kesh or Kush
- Elevation: 2,305 metres (7,562 ft)

Third Approach
- Location: Fars province, Iran
- Range: Zagros Mountains
- Coordinates: 30°48′8.4″N 53°9′52.2″E

Gardaneh ye Kuli Kesh Romanized Gardaneh i Kuli Kash, Gardaneh e quli Kosh (Arabic: گَردَنِۀ كُولی كُش or Persian: گردنه کولى کش or Persian: گَردَنِۀ كُولی كوش) is a mountain pass of the Zagros mountain Range.
