= Gahar Lake =

Lake in Lorestan Province, Iran

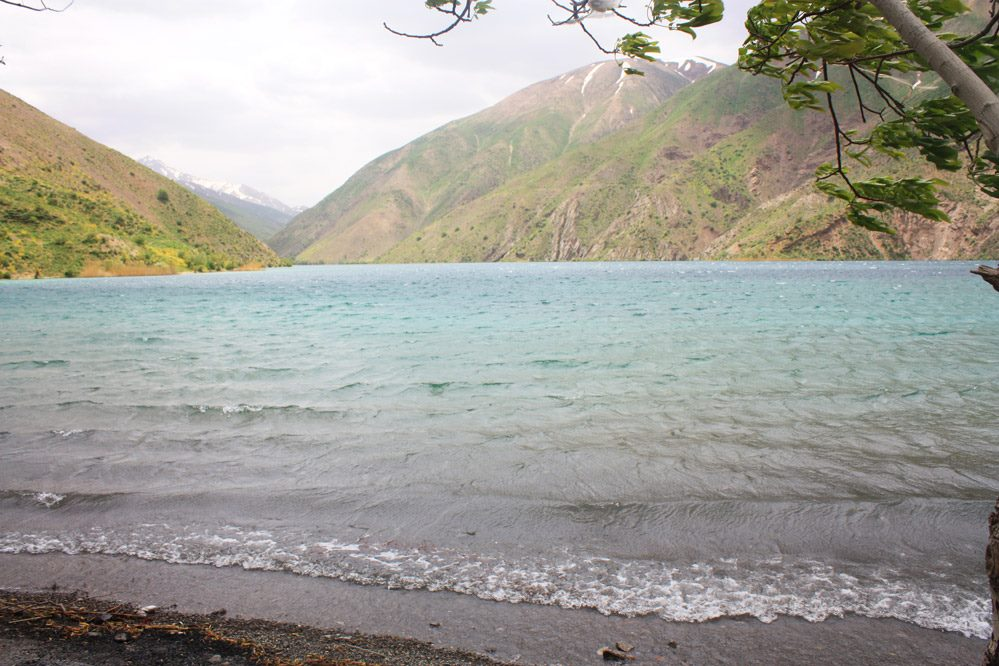
- Gahar Doroud Lake

- Location within Iran
- Interactive map of Gahar Lake
- Coordinates: 33°18′23″N 49°17′02″E
- Type: Lake
- Primary inflows: rain
- Primary outflows: none
- Max. length: 1,500 metres (4,900 ft)
- Surface area: 100 hectares (250 acres)
- Surface elevation: 2,400 metres (7,900 ft)
- Settlements: Dorud, Lorestan, Iran

Gahar Lake (Persian: دریاچه گهر), also known as Gohar Lake or Gol Gahar, is located in the highlands of Iran, in the southeast of Dorud, in Lorestan province protected zone at an elevation of 2,400 meters. The lake is known as the 'Jewel of Oshtarankooh'. Due to the lack of roads and low use of cars and automobiles, it is practically free from being damaged and polluted by humans. About 70,000 tourists visit the area annually.

== History ==
Most Europeans and tourists know this lake as Iran Lake, which is the result of the introduction of an English woman named Isabella Lucy Bishop, who in 1890 was able to explore the area for 3 months and walk a thousand kilometers, but according to documents historically, the first European to discover Lake Gahar was an Austrian geologist named A-Rudler, who in 1888 made history as the discoverer of Lake Gahar.

When he discovered the lake, he had walked from the heights of Oshtarankooh in Dorud. The first and oldest documentary image of the lake was taken in 1891, belonging to a French tourist named Jean-Jacques Dumergané.

=== Formation ===
Gahar Lake was most likely caused and formed by a large earthquake. The lake is located on the main fault of modern Zagros; Therefore, a landslide is probably formed as a result of fault movement and event.

== Geographical location ==
=== Ownership ===
During the past several years, tensions over the ownership of the lake has been raised by the cities around it, which a lawsuit has been sent by the Dorud city's governor and municipality to the Ministry of Interior. In response to the lawsuit, the Ministry of Interior sent a letter with a map and geographical location of Gahar Lake to the neighboring governorates and municipalities of Dorud, reminding them that the lake is completely located in the territory of Dorud city, and it belongs to the city.

Gahar consists of two parts. It includes upper Gahar (the small one), and the lower Gahar (the big one) lakes. The upper Gahar is about 1700 meters long, 400 to 800 meters wide, and 4 to 28 meters deep. At the lower and upper parts of the lake, there is a dense forest that is on the verge and danger of extinction. From the top, blue water flows into the lake, which continues to other lakes.

The inflow of the lake water is 10 cubic feet per second and the outflow is about 20 cubic feet per second. The reason for the increase in the volume of water leaving the lake is the presence of springs in its lower part. The main water supply of the lake is through its creek, Tapleh River, which has a very cool, clear, and sparkling water with a bed full of pebbles and stones, which enters the lower lake without falling and with a little acceleration it enters the upper lake after a short expanse.

=== Rainfall in the region ===
Annual rainfall in Gohar region is about 933 mm, which is mostly snowfall.

Vegetation

The vegetation of this region includes trees and plants such as oak, willow, almond, terebinth (wild pistachio), European pear, plane trees, elm, quercus infectoria, walnut, fig, European ash, apple, hawthorn, prunus dulcis, Gahar's ziziphus spina-christi, pomegranate, gaz, and vinifera (wild grapes). Flowers include: Fritillaria, anemone, lily, tulip, amaranth, and Indian shot.

== Gallery ==
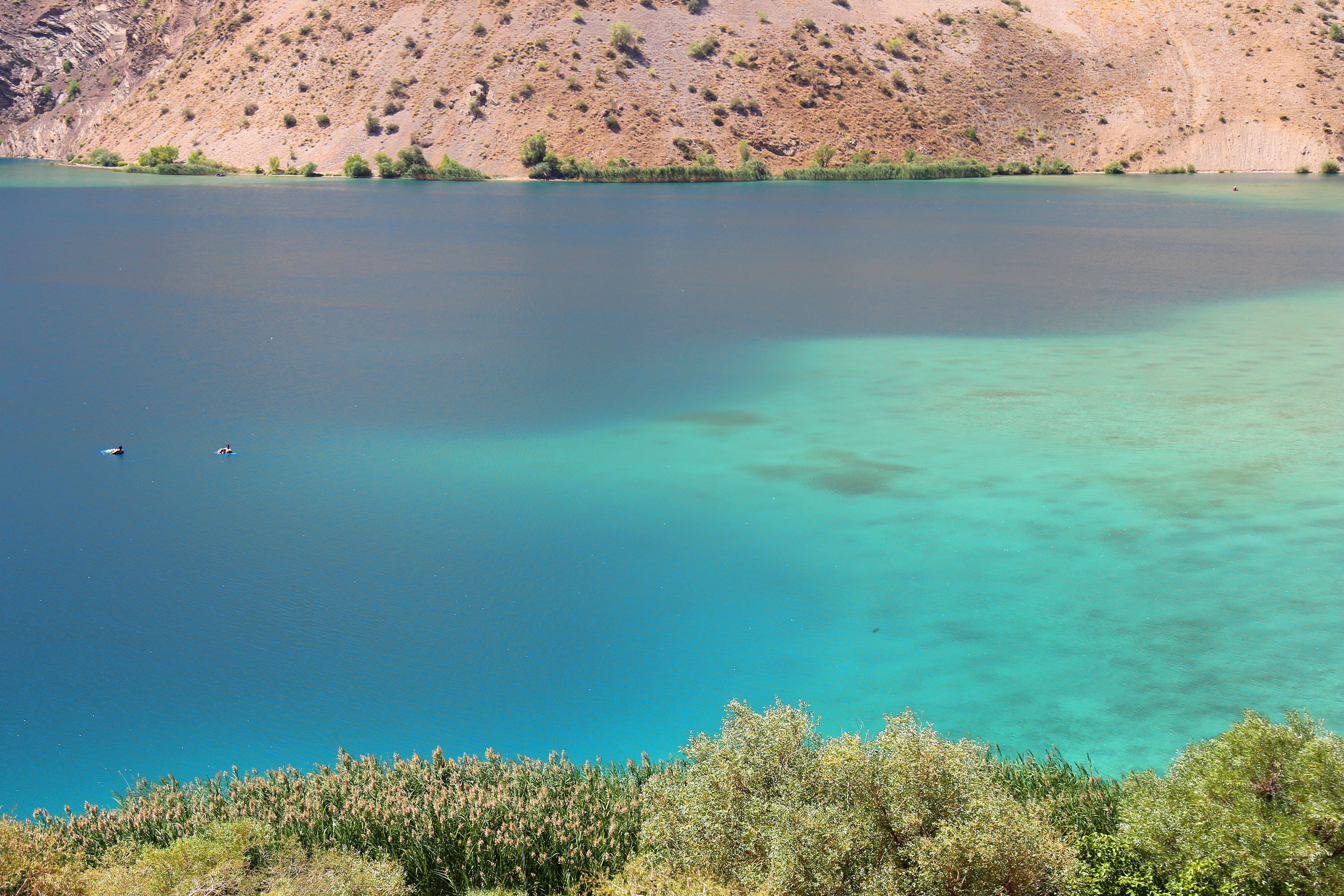
Gahar Lake, Dorud, Lorestan, Iran

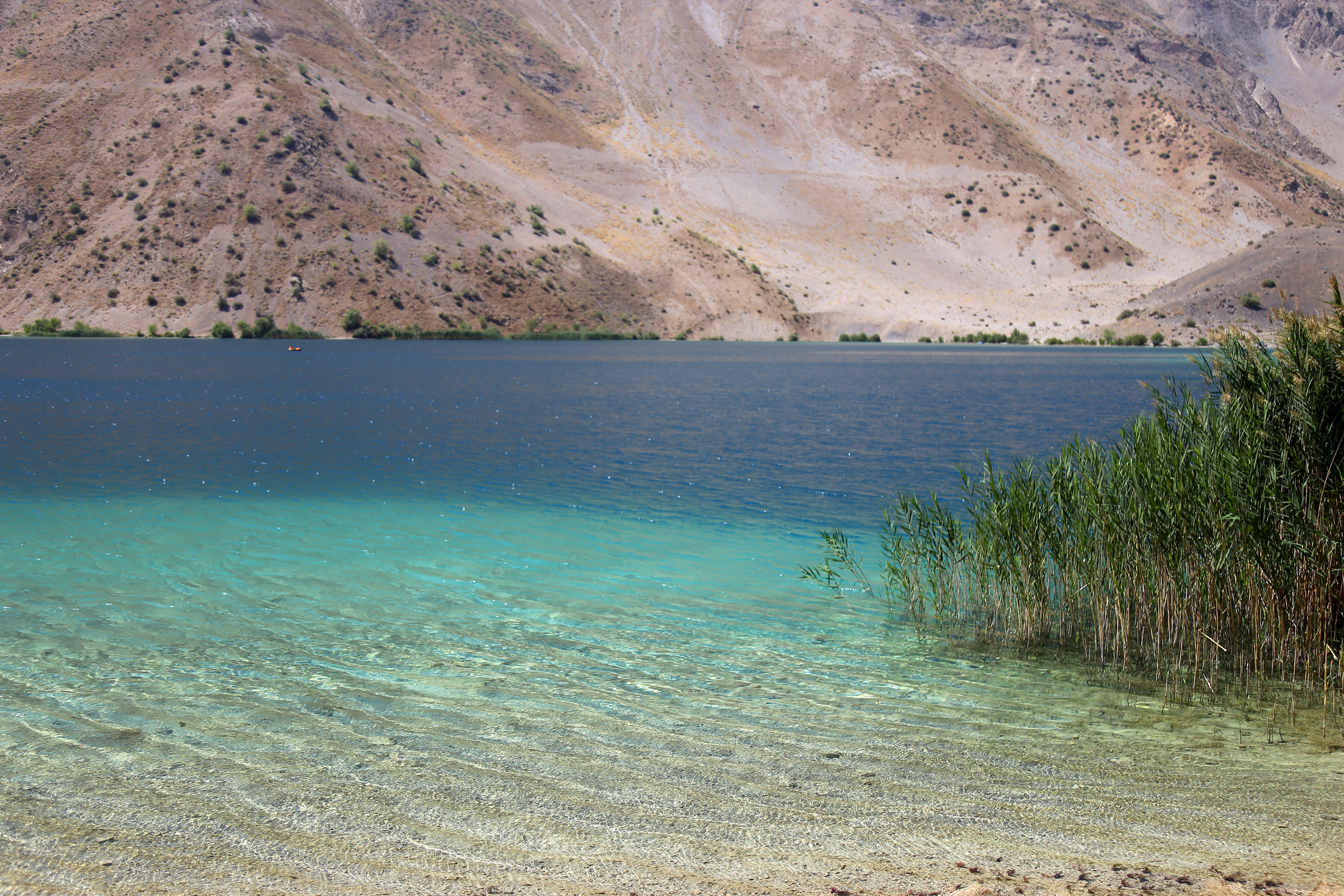
Gahar Lake, Dorud, Lorestan, Iran
