= Zagros Mountains =

Mountain range in Western Asia

Zagros

Highest point
- Peak: Qash-Mastan (Dena)
- Elevation: 4,409 m (14,465 ft)
- Coordinates: 30°57′N 51°26′E

Dimensions
- Length: 1,600 km (990 mi)
- Width: 240 km (150 mi)

Geography
- Location: Iran, Iraq, and Turkey
- Range coordinates: 33°40′N 47°00′E

Geology
- Rock age: Carboniferous
- Mountain type: Fold and thrust belt

The Zagros Mountains (Note: Persian: کوه‌های زاگرس, romanized: Kuh hā-ye Zāgros; Arabic: جبال زاغروس, romanized: Jibāl Zāghrūs; Kurdish: چیاکانی زاگرۆس, romanized: Çiyakanî Zagros; Turkish: Zagros Dağları; Luri: Kûya Zagrus چغائیا زاگرس or کوه یل زاگرس) are a mountain range in West Asia spanning Iran, northern Iraq, and southeastern Turkey. The range has a total length of 1,600 km (990 miles). The Zagros range begins in northwestern Iran and roughly follows Iran's western border while covering much of southeastern Turkey and northeastern Iraq. From this border region, the range continues southeast to the waters of the Persian Gulf. It spans the southern parts of the Armenian highlands, northern and northeastern and east-central part of Iraqi Kurdistan, the whole length of the western and southwestern Iranian plateau, and ends at the Strait of Hormuz. The highest point is Mount Dena, at 4,409 metres (14,465 ft).

== Geology ==
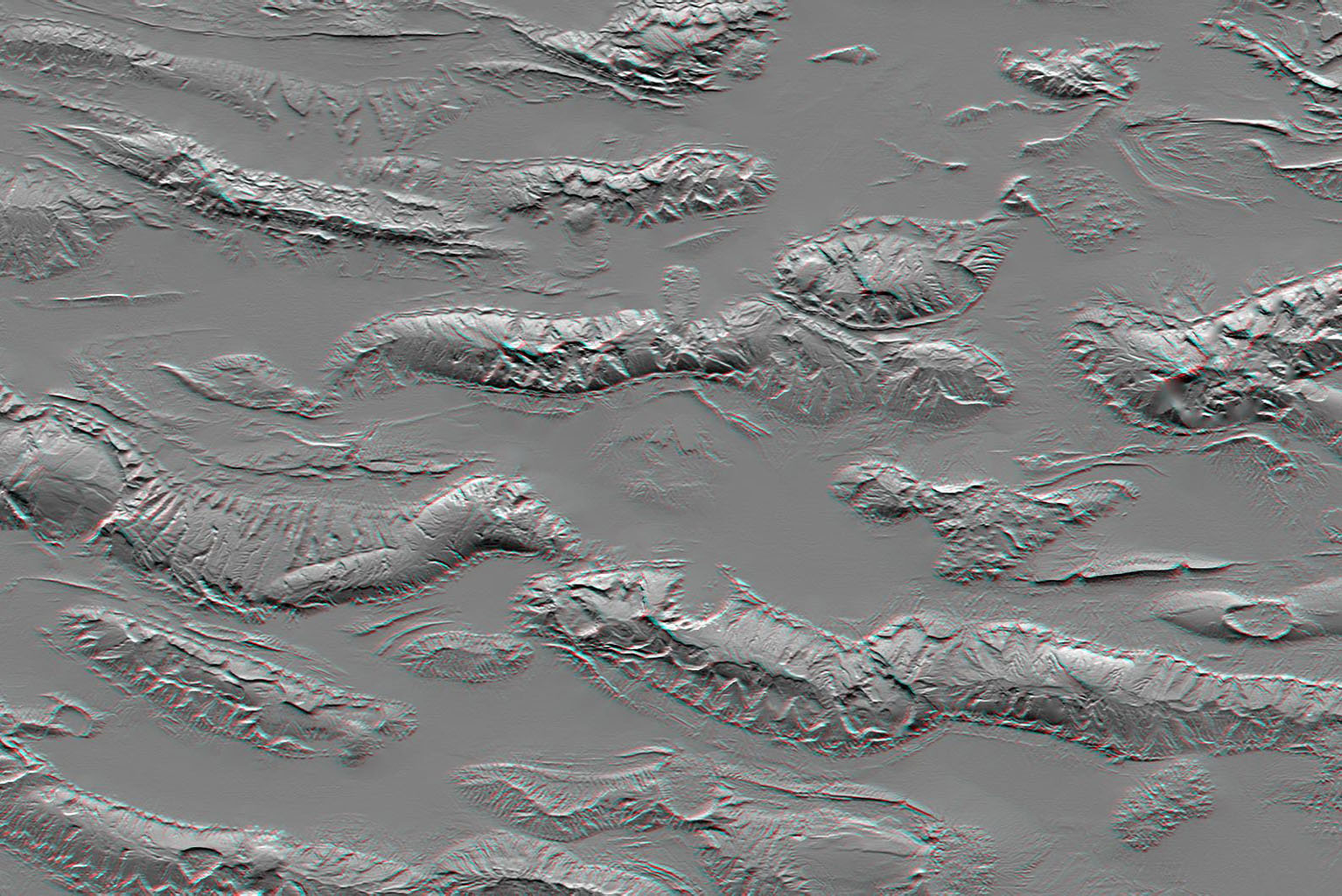
SRTM shaded relief anaglyph of Zagros Mountains

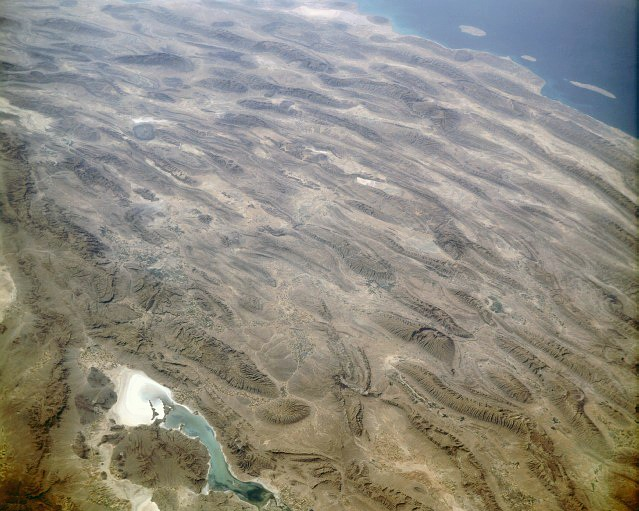
The Zagros Mountains from space, September 1992

The Zagros fold and thrust belt was mainly formed by the collision of two tectonic plates, the Eurasian Plate and the Arabian Plate. This collision mainly happened during the Miocene (about 25–5 mya) and folded the entirety of the rocks that had been deposited from the Paleozoic (541–242 mya) to the Cenozoic (66 mya – present) in the passive continental margin on the Arabian Plate. However, the obduction of Neotethys oceanic crust during the Cretaceous (145–66 mya), and the continental arc collision in the Eocene (56–34 mya) both had major effects on uplifts in the northeastern parts of the belt.

The process of collision continues to the present, and as the Arabian Plate is being pushed against the Eurasian Plate, the Zagros Mountains and the Iranian plateau are getting higher and higher. Recent GPS measurements in Iran have shown that this collision is still active and the resulting deformation is distributed non-uniformly in the country, mainly taken up in the major mountain belts like Alborz and Zagros. A relatively dense GPS network which covered the Iranian Zagros also proves a high rate of deformation within the Zagros. The GPS results show that the current rate of shortening in the southeast Zagros is ~10 mm/a (0.39 in/year), dropping to ~5 mm/a (0.20 in/year) in the northwest Zagros. The north–south Kazerun strike-slip fault divides the Zagros into two distinct zones of deformation. The GPS results also show different shortening directions along the belt, normal shortening in the southeast, and oblique shortening in the northwest Zagros. The Zagros mountains were created around the time of the second ice age, which caused the tectonic collision, leading to its uniqueness.

The sedimentary cover in the SE Zagros is deforming above a layer of rock salt (acting as a ductile decollement with a low basal friction), whereas in the NW Zagros the salt layer is missing or is very thin. This different basal friction is partly responsible for the different topographies on either side of the Kazerun fault. Higher topography and narrower zone of deformation in the NW Zagros is observed whereas in the SE, deformation was spread more and a wider zone of deformation with lower topography was formed. Stresses induced in the Earth's crust by the collision caused extensive folding of the preexisting layered sedimentary rocks. Subsequent erosion removed softer rocks, such as mudstone (rock formed by consolidated mud) and siltstone (a slightly coarser-grained mudstone) while leaving harder rocks, such as limestone (calcium-rich rock consisting of the remains of marine organisms) and dolomite (rocks similar to limestone containing calcium and magnesium). This differential erosion formed the linear ridges of the Zagros Mountains.

The depositional environment and tectonic history of the rocks were conducive to the formation and trapping of petroleum, and the Zagros region is an important area for oil production. Salt domes and salt glaciers are a common feature of the Zagros Mountains. Salt domes are an important target for petroleum exploration, as the impermeable salt frequently traps petroleum beneath other rock layers. There is also much water-soluble gypsum in the region.

=== Type and age of rock ===
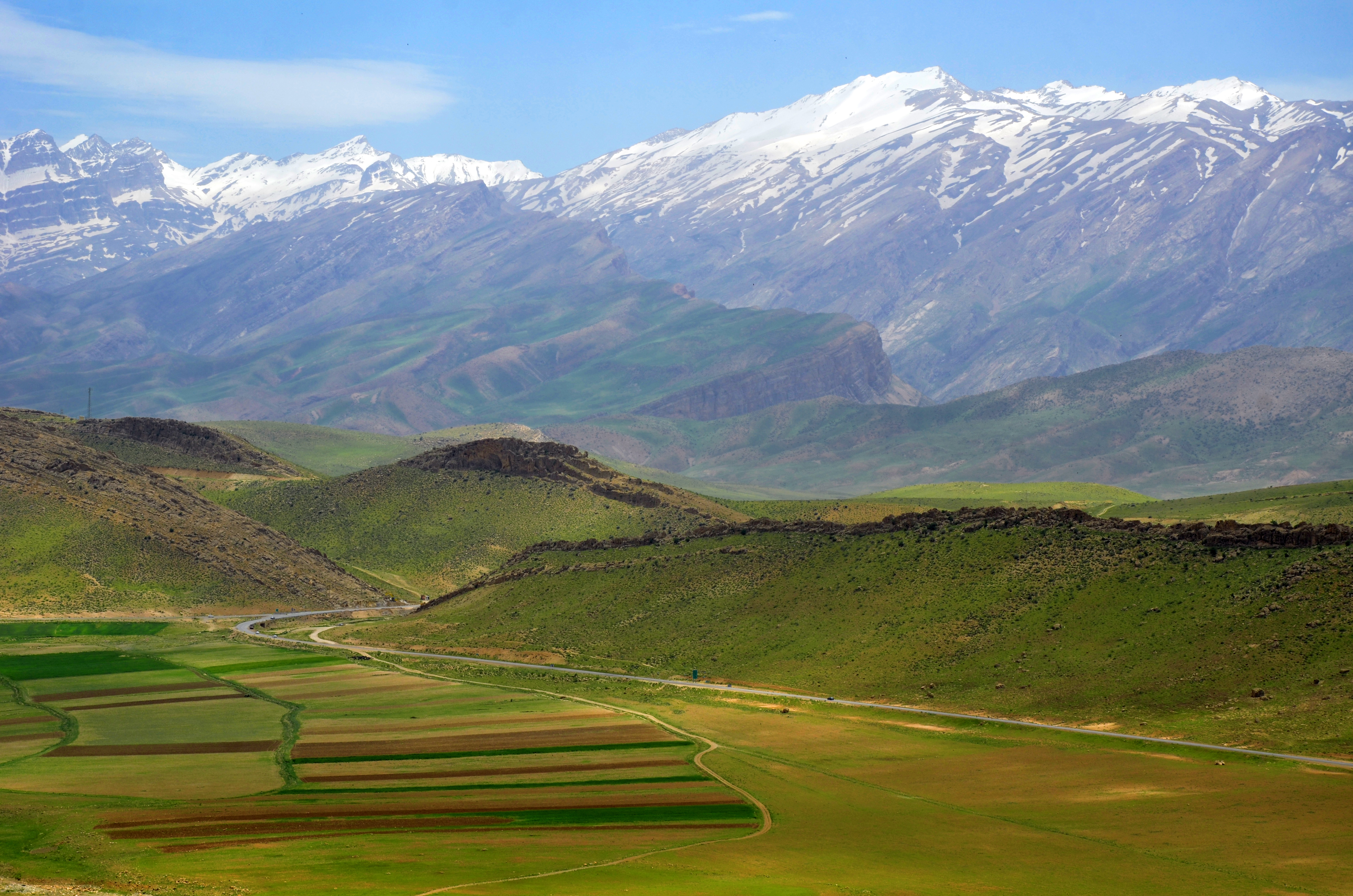
Glaciers on Dena

The mountains are completely of sedimentary origin and are made primarily of limestone. In the Elevated Zagros or the Higher Zagros, the Paleozoic rocks can be found mainly in the upper and higher sections of the peaks of the Zagros Mountains, along the Zagros main fault. On both sides of this fault, there are Mesozoic rocks, a combination of Triassic (252–201 mya) and Jurassic (201–145 mya) rocks that are surrounded by Cretaceous rocks on both sides. The Folded Zagros (the mountains south of the Elevated Zagros and almost parallel to the main Zagros fault) is formed mainly of Tertiary rocks, with the Paleogene (66–23 mya) rocks south of the Cretaceous rocks and then the Neogene (23–2.6 mya) rocks south of the Paleogene rocks. The mountains are divided into many parallel sub-ranges (up to 10 or 250 km (6.2 or 155.3 miles) wide), and orogenically have the same age as the Alps.

Iran's main oilfields lie in the western central foothills of the Zagros mountain range. The southern ranges of the Fars province have somewhat lower summits, reaching 4,000 metres (13,000 feet). They contain some limestone rocks showing abundant marine fossils.

== Highest peaks ==
The peaks that are at least 3800 meters high and have a topographic prominence of at least 300 meters:

	Name	Sub-range	Height (m)	Prominence (m)
1	Qash-Mastan	Dena	4409	2604
2	Kale Qodveis	Dena	4341	424
3	Pazane Pir	Dena	4250	1080
4	Kuh-e Dama	Dena	4216	504
5	Kolonchin	Zard-Kuh	4221	2095
6	Chegaleh	Zard-Kuh	4134	594
7	Haft Tanan	Zard-Kuh	4104	653
8	San-Borān	Oshtorankuh	4150	1928
9	Qalikuh		4078	1420
10	Shahankuh		4038	1427
11	Qanbarkosh		3982	316
12	Haft Cheshmeh		3975	1545
13	Cheshmeh Kuhrang		3969	360
14	Karpush		3961	915
15	Bel		3943	1563
16	Khurbeh		3902	915
17	Darab Shah		3900	1495
18	Piaro Kamandan		3891	370
19	Hezar Darreh		3890	1628
20	Kuh-e Hashtad		3869	1248
21	Chahardah Pahlu		3845	949
22	Dome Qalikuh		3839	602
23	Kule Jonou		3823	422
24	Halgurd Mountain		3607	1575

== History ==
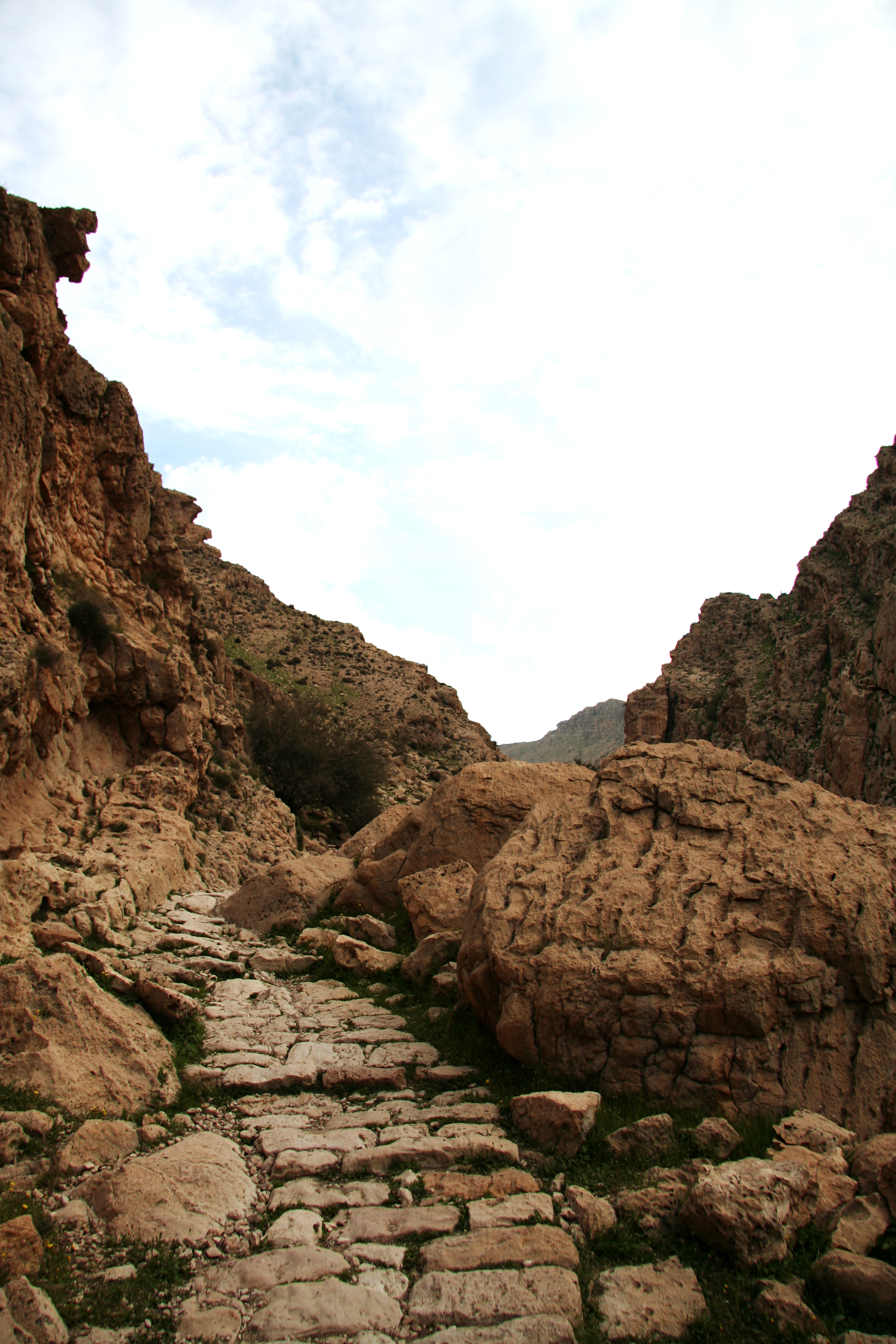
Stone-paved Achaemenid Road in Zagros, Behbahan

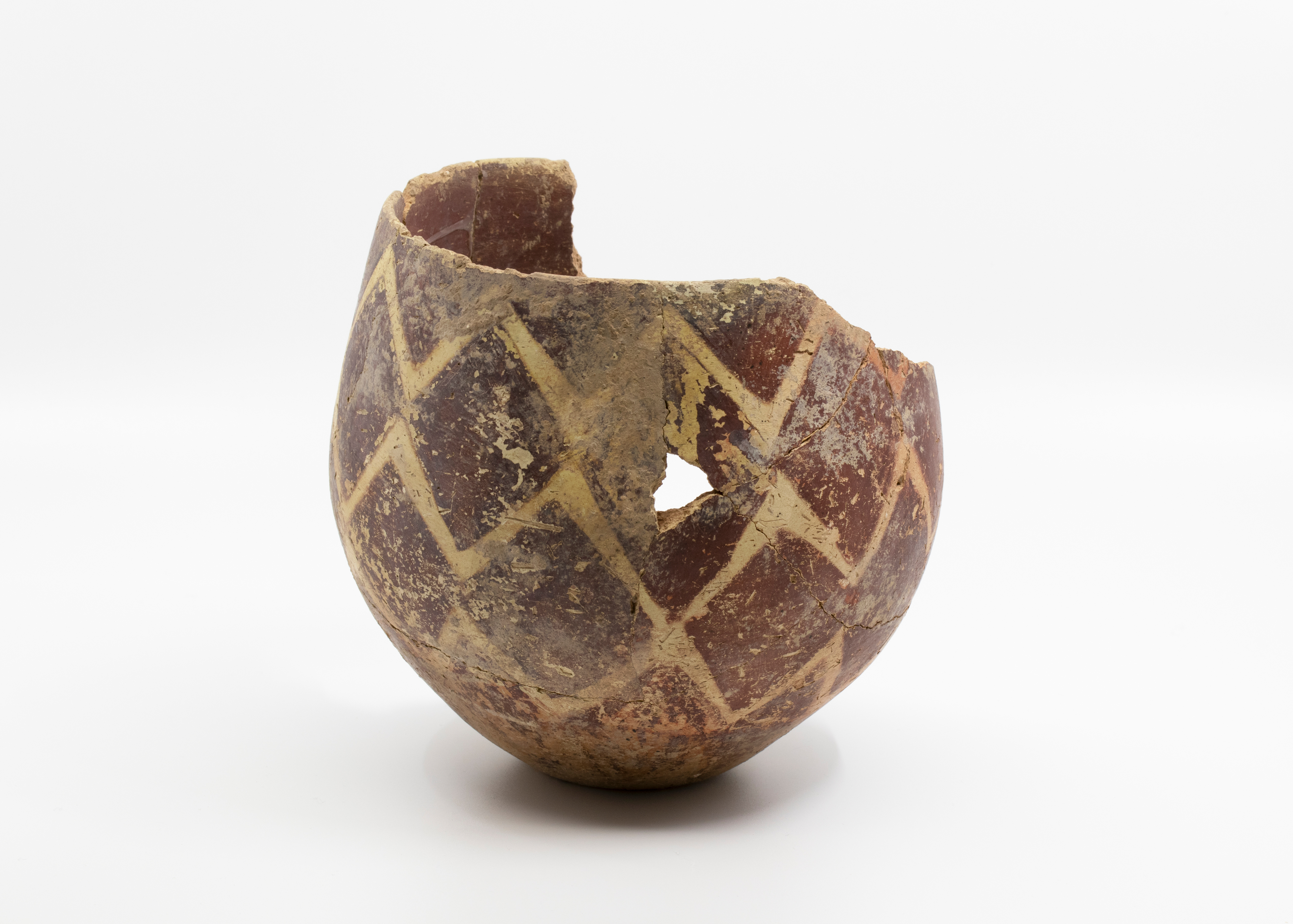
A ceramic ware excavated in Zagros, Dalma Tepe

The Zagros Mountains have significant ancient history. They were occupied by early humans since the Lower Paleolithic Period. The earliest human fossils discovered in Zagros belong to Neanderthals and come from Shanidar Cave, Bisitun Cave, and Wezmeh Cave. The remains of ten Neanderthals, dating from around 65,000–35,000 years ago, have been found in the Shanidar Cave. The cave also contains two later "proto-Neolithic" cemeteries, one of which dates back about 10,600 years and contains 35 individuals. Iran's Middle Paleolithic sites are mostly located in the Zagros. Mousterian stone tools can be found at these cave sites. Evidence from later Upper Paleolithic and Epipaleolithic occupations come from Yafteh Cave, Kaldar Cave near Khoramabad, and Warwasi, Malaverd near Kermanshah, Kenacheh Cave in Kurdistan, Boof Cave in Fars and a number of other caves and rock shelters. The Upper Paleolithic is characterized by Baradostian and Zarzian stone tools. Compared to the Mousterian the Baradostian shows an increase in the number of tool types as well as a greater emphasis on tool making techniques.

Signs of early agriculture date back as far as 9000 BC in the foothills of the mountains. Some settlements later grew into cities, eventually named Anshan and Susa; Jarmo is one archaeological site in this area. Some of the earliest evidence of wine production has been discovered in the mountains; both the settlements of Hajji Firuz Tepe and Godin Tepe have given evidence of wine storage dating between 3500 and 5400 BC.

A human metatarsal bone fragment from Wezmeh Cave has been analyzed and dated to the Neolithic period. The DNA from this bone fragment shows that it is from a distinct genetic group, which was not known to scientists before. He belongs to the Y-DNA haplogroup G2b, specifically its branch G-Y37100, and mitochondrial haplogroup J1d6. He had brown eyes, relatively dark skin, and black hair, although Neolithic pre Indo-European Iranians carried reduced pigmentation-associated alleles in several genes and derived alleles at 7 of the 12 loci, showing the strongest signatures of selection in ancient Eurasians. He did not contribute to the genetic makeup of early European farmers or modern Europeans. Instead, he was the most genetically similar to modern Iranian Zoroastrians, followed by Fars, Balochi, Brahui, Kalash and Georgians. Gallego-Llorente et al. (2016) believes that the Zagros Mountain was a plausible source of Eurasian ancestry in Central and South Asia, along with Kotias, which was inhabited by Caucasus Hunter-Gatherers. He cites archaeological evidence of eastward Neolithic expansions from the Near East.

During early ancient times, the Zagros was the home of various Pre Indo-European peoples such as the Hurrians, Guti, Kassites, Elamites, Turukku and Lullubi, (together with Semitic peoples such as Assyrians and Amorites on the western side) who periodically invaded the Sumerian, Akkadian and Assyrian cities of Mesopotamia. The mountains create a geographic barrier between the Mesopotamian Plain, which is in modern Iraq, and the Iranian plateau. A small archive of clay tablets detailing the complex interactions of these groups in the early second millennium BC has been found at Tell Shemshara along the Little Zab. Tell Bazmusian, near Shemshara, was occupied between 5000 BCE and 800 CE, although not continuously.

== Population ==
The Zagros mountains have been inhabited by different groups of pastoralists and farmers for thousands of years. Current Pastoralist groups such as Lurs, Bakhtiari Lurs, Kurds or Qashqais move from their herds from the east slopes in summer (Yeylāgh) to the west slopes in winter (Gheshlāgh). Some major cities are located on the foothills of the Zagros mountains, including Sulaymaniyah, Kermanshah, Khorramabad, and Shiraz. According to Oberlander, the "traditional ethno-geographic divisions of the Zagros Highland have real significance, for the lands of the various tribal groups are different. Each has a character of its own. Accordingly, Kurdistan, Luristan, the Bakhtiari, Kuhgalu, and Fars are distinctive geographic entities in a physical sense as well as an ethnic sense."

=== Lurs ===
The Lurs are an Iranic tribe, primarily inhabiting the Central, Western, and Southern Zagros. Cities inhibited by Lurs include Khorramabad, Borujerd, Malayer, Izeh, Shahr-e Kord, Yasuj. Lurs speak Luri and span across many provinces in Iran including Lorestan, Khuzestan, Chaharmahal and Bakthiari, Ilam, Kohgiluyeh and Boyer-Ahmad, and Hamedan.

=== Bakhtiari Lurs ===
The Bakhtiaris are a Lur tribe from Iran, primarily inhabiting the Central and South Zagros. Major cities inhabited by Bakhtiaris include Masjed Soleyman, Izeh and Shahr-e Kord. A significant number of Bakhtiari still practice nomadic pastoralism.

=== Kurds ===
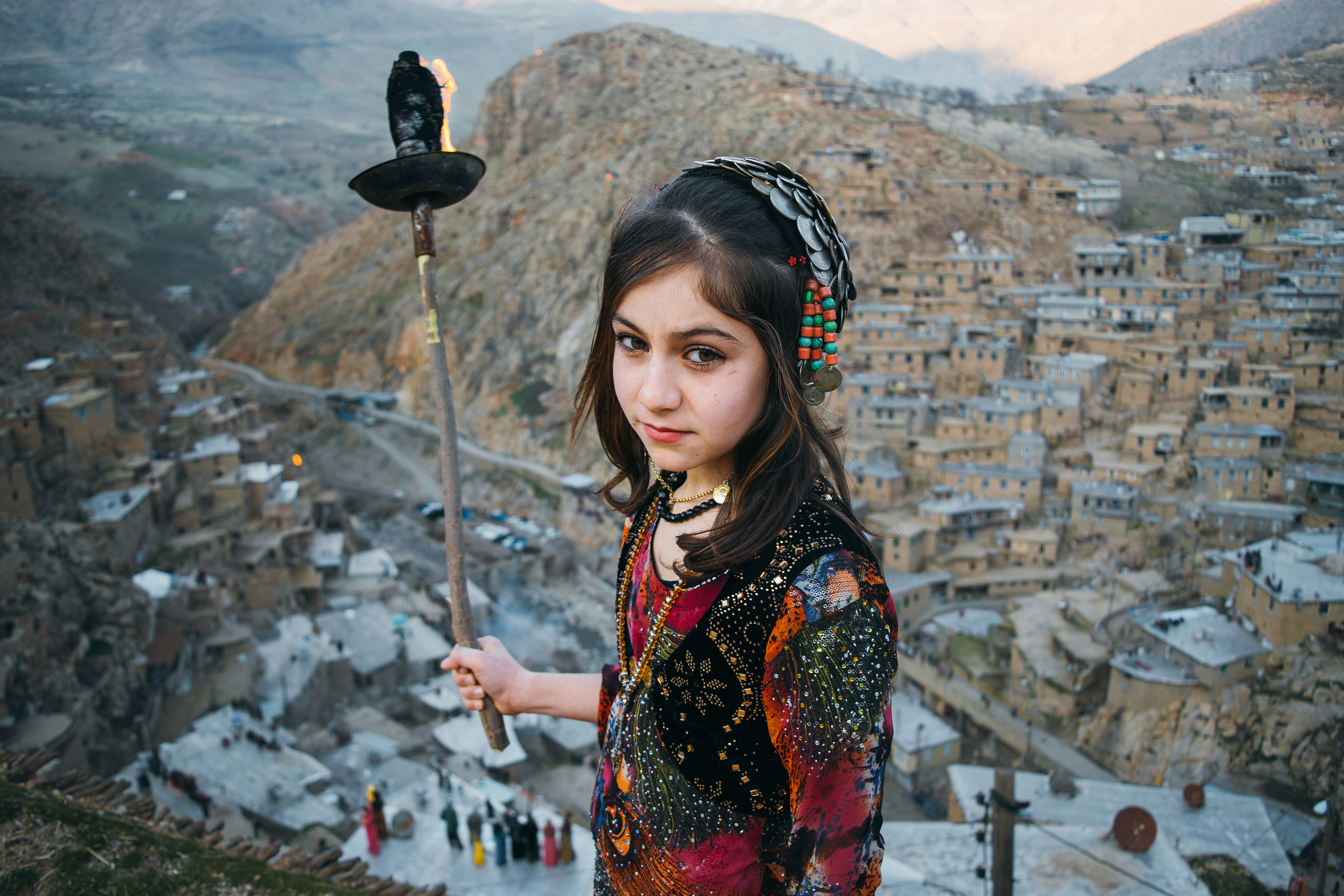
A Kurdish girl in the western Zagros village of Palangan celebrating Newroz

Kurds the indigenous inhabitants of the northwestern and central Zagros-Taurus mountain ranges, which spans southeastern Turkey, northwestern Iran, northern Iraq, and northern Syria. The high altitude of the Zagros mountains produces a series of choke points and valleys perfect for agriculture and human development. It has also long defended the Kurds in times of war by acting as a natural barrier.

=== Qashqai ===
Qashqai people are a tribal confederation in Iran mostly of Turkic origin. Significant populations can be found in Central and South Zagros, especially around the city of Shiraz in the Fars province.

=== Assyrians, Chaldeans, Syriacs and Persians ===
The Zagros is also home to populations of Assyrians, Chaldeans, Syriacs and Persians.

== Climate ==
The mountains contain several ecosystems. Prominent among them are the forest and forest steppe areas with a semi-arid climate. As defined by the World Wildlife Fund and used in their Wildfinder, the particular terrestrial ecoregion of the mid to high mountain area is Zagros Mountains forest steppe (PA0446). The annual precipitation ranges from 400–800 mm (16–31 in) and falls mostly in winter and spring. Winters are severe, with low temperatures often below −25 °C (−13 °F). The region exemplifies the continental variation of the Mediterranean climate pattern, with a snowy winter and mild, rainy spring, followed by a dry summer and autumn.

Climate data for Amadiya District, Iraq
Month	Jan	Feb	Mar	Apr	May	Jun	Jul	Aug	Sep	Oct	Nov	Dec	Year
Mean daily maximum °C (°F)	−0.2 (31.6)	1.4 (34.5)	6.4 (43.5)	12.2 (54.0)	19.3 (66.7)	24.8 (76.6)	29.7 (85.5)	29.6 (85.3)	25.6 (78.1)	17.7 (63.9)	9.7 (49.5)	2.7 (36.9)	14.9 (58.8)
Mean daily minimum °C (°F)	−8.0 (17.6)	−6.8 (19.8)	−2.0 (28.4)	3.5 (38.3)	8.8 (47.8)	13.0 (55.4)	17.3 (63.1)	16.9 (62.4)	13.0 (55.4)	7.2 (45.0)	2.1 (35.8)	−4.3 (24.3)	5.1 (41.1)

=== Glaciation ===
The mountains of the East-Zagros, the Kuh-i-Jupar (4,135 m (13,566 ft)), Kuh-i-Lalezar (4,374 m (14,350 ft)) and Kuh-i-Hezar (4,469 m (14,662 ft)) do not currently have glaciers. Only at Zard Kuh and Dena some glaciers still survive. However, before the Last Glacial Period they had been glaciated to a depth in excess of 1,900 metres (1.2 miles), and during the Last Glacial Period to a depth in excess of 2,160 metres (7,090 feet). Evidence exists of a 20 km (12 miles) wide glacier fed along a 17 km (11 miles) long valley dropping approximately 1,600 m (5,200 ft) along its length on the north side of Kuh-i-Jupar with a thickness of 350–550 m (1,150–1,800 ft). Under conditions of precipitation comparable to current climatic record-keeping, this size of glacier could be expected to form where the annual average temperature was between 10.5 and 11.2 °C (50.9 and 52.2 °F), but since conditions are expected to have been dryer during the period in which this glacier was formed, the temperature must have been lower.

== Flora and fauna ==
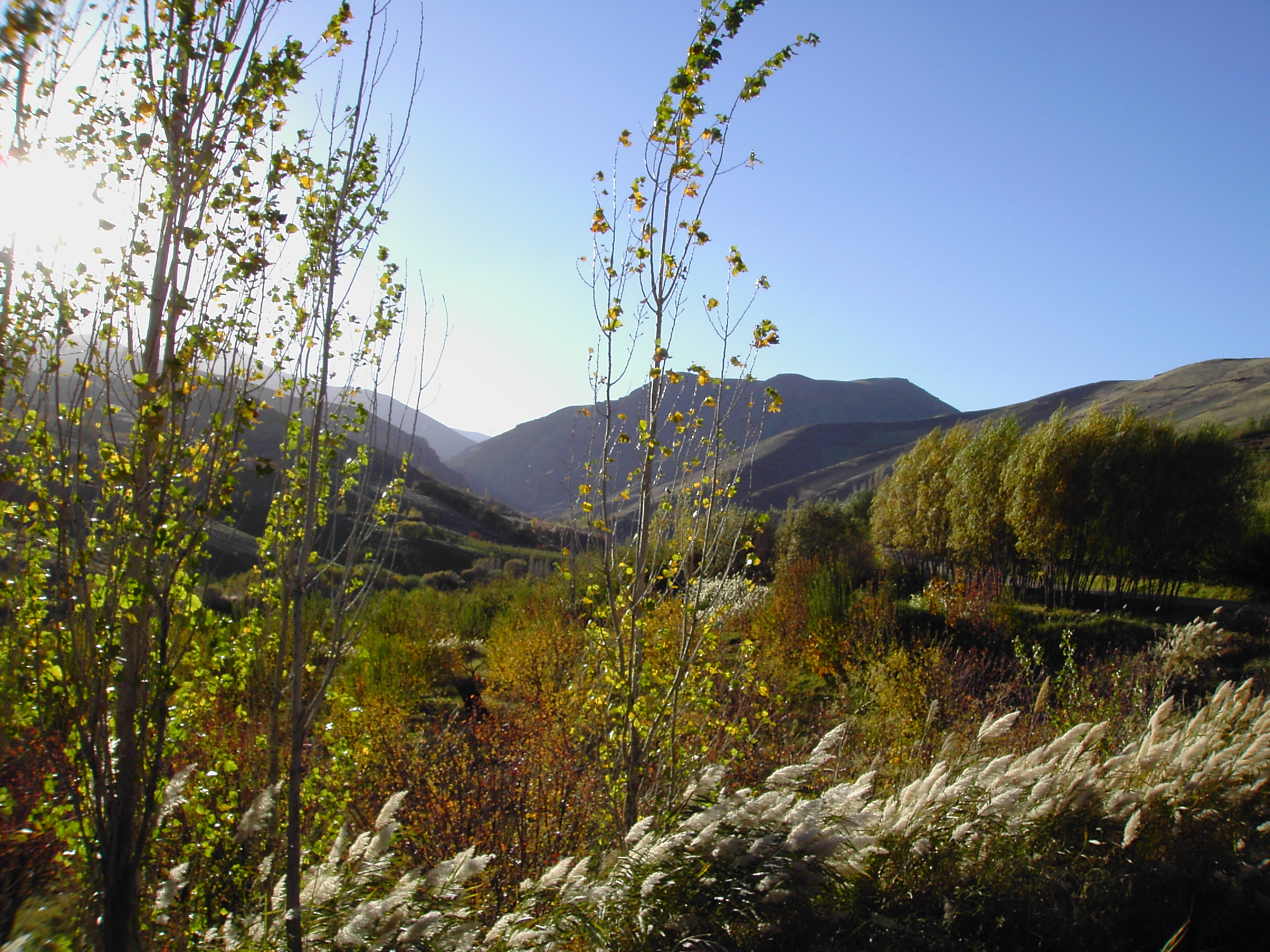
A view of Quercus brantii forests that dominate the Zagros Mountains

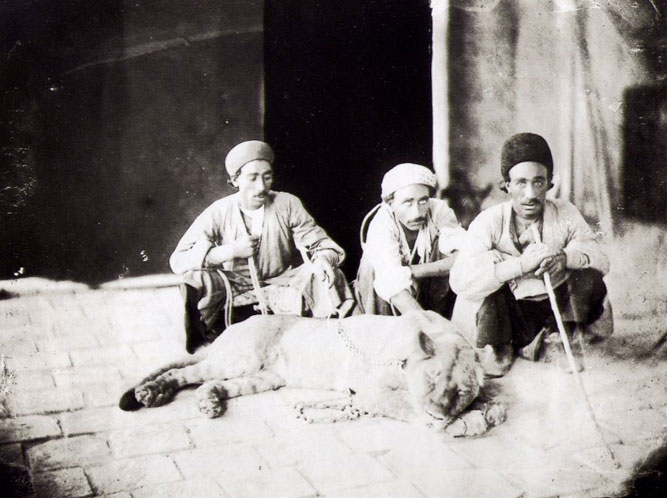
Men with a restrained lion in Iran. This photograph was taken by Antoin Sevruguin, c. 1880, before the lion's extirpation in the country.

=== Flora ===
Although currently degraded through overgrazing and deforestation, the Zagros region is home to a rich and complex flora. Remnants of the originally widespread oak-dominated woodland can still be found, as can the park-like pistachio/almond steppelands. The ancestors of many familiar foods, including wheat, barley, lentil, almond, walnut, pistachio, apricot, plum, pomegranate and grape can be found growing wild throughout the mountains. Quercus brantii (covering more than 50% of the Zagros forest area) is the most important tree species of the Zagros in Iran.

Other floral endemics found within the mountain range include: Allium iranicum, Astragalus crenophila, Bellevalia kurdistanica, Cousinia carduchorum, Cousinia odontolepis, Echinops rectangularis, Erysimum boissieri, Iris barnumiae, Ornithogalum iraqense, Scrophularia atroglandulosa, Scorzonera kurdistanica, Tragopogon rechingeri, and Tulipa kurdica.

=== Fauna ===
The Zagros are home to many threatened and endangered species, including the Zagros Mountains mouse-like hamster (Calomyscus bailwardi), the Basra reed-warbler (Acrocephalus griseldis) and the striped hyena (Hyena hyena). The Persian fallow deer (Dama dama mesopotamica), an ancient domesticate once thought extinct, was rediscovered in the late 20th century in Khuzestan Province, in the southern Zagros. Also, wild goats can be found almost all over the Zagros mountain range. In the late 19th century, the Asiatic lion (Panthera leo persica) inhabited the southwestern part of the mountains. It is now extinct in this region.

The Luristan newt (Neurergus kaiseri) is a salamander endemic to a small section of the central Zagros Mountains in Iran. It lives in highland streams and is primarily aquatic. This newt is considered vulnerable to extinction due to poaching for the pet trade and habitat destruction. Climate change is predicted to strongly impact this species.

== Religion ==
The entrance to the ancient Mesopotamian underworld was believed to be located in the Zagros Mountains in the far east. A staircase led down to the gates of the underworld. The underworld itself is usually located even deeper below ground than the Abzu, the body of freshwater which the ancient Mesopotamians believed lay deep beneath the earth. The region was influenced by Mesopotamian and Hurrian religion in the Bronze and Iron Ages, and later by Zoroastrianism and Syriac Christianity. Today the vast majority of the population are Iranic and Turkic Muslims, with small numbers of Christians, mainly Assyrians and Armenians also extant.

== Gallery ==
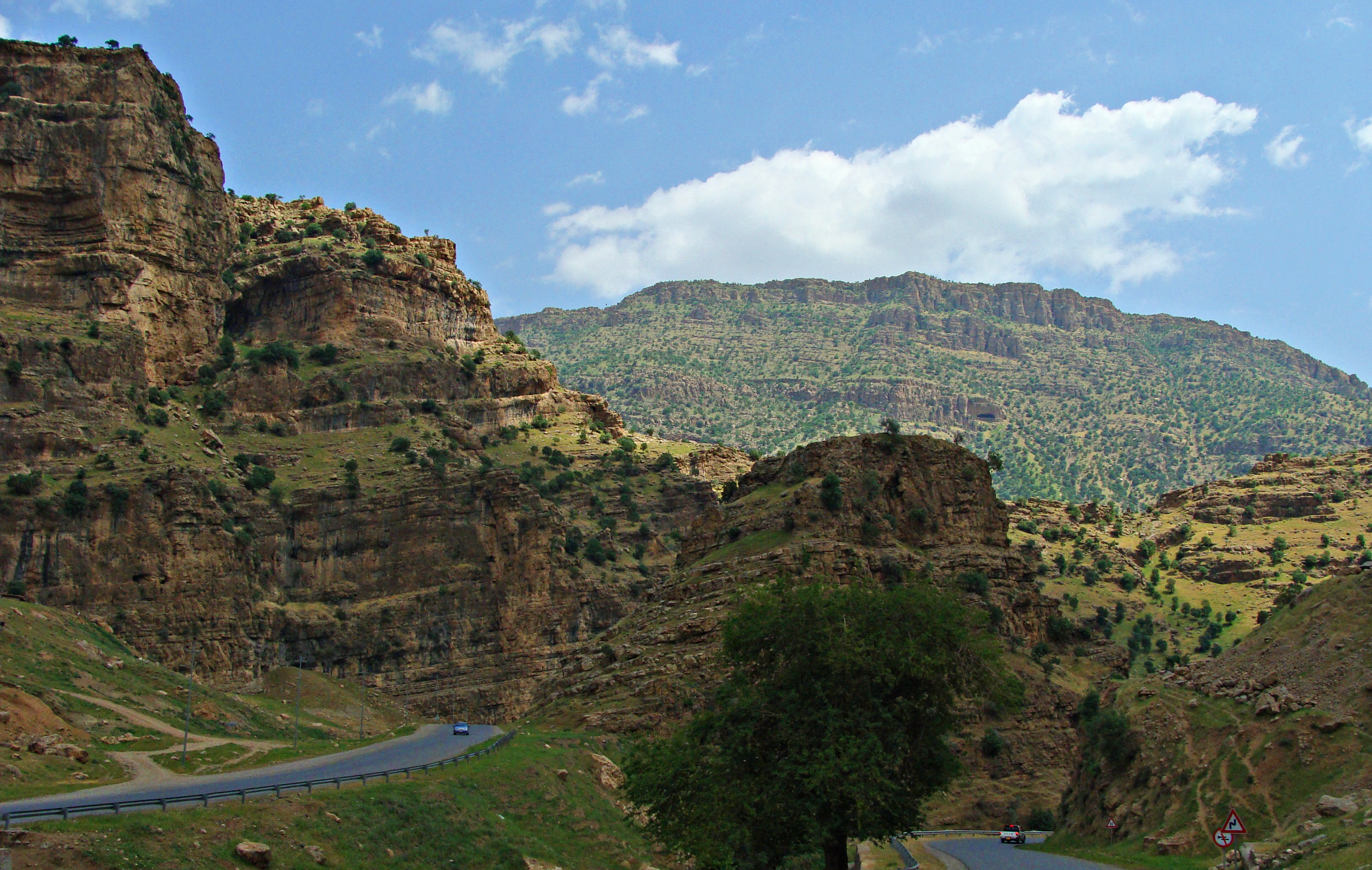
A road through the Zagros mountains in Iraqi Kurdistan

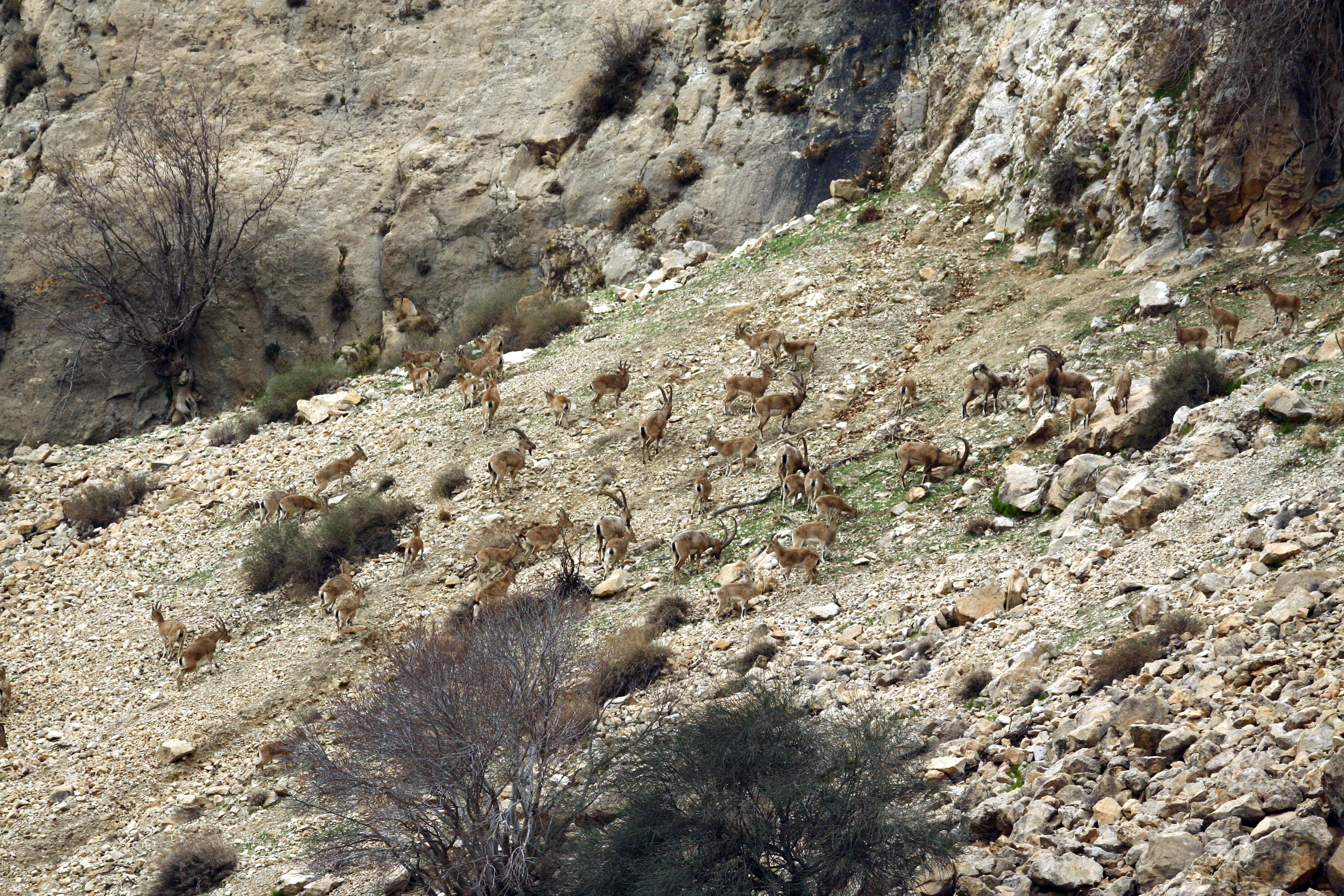
Wild goat herd, Zagros, Behbahan

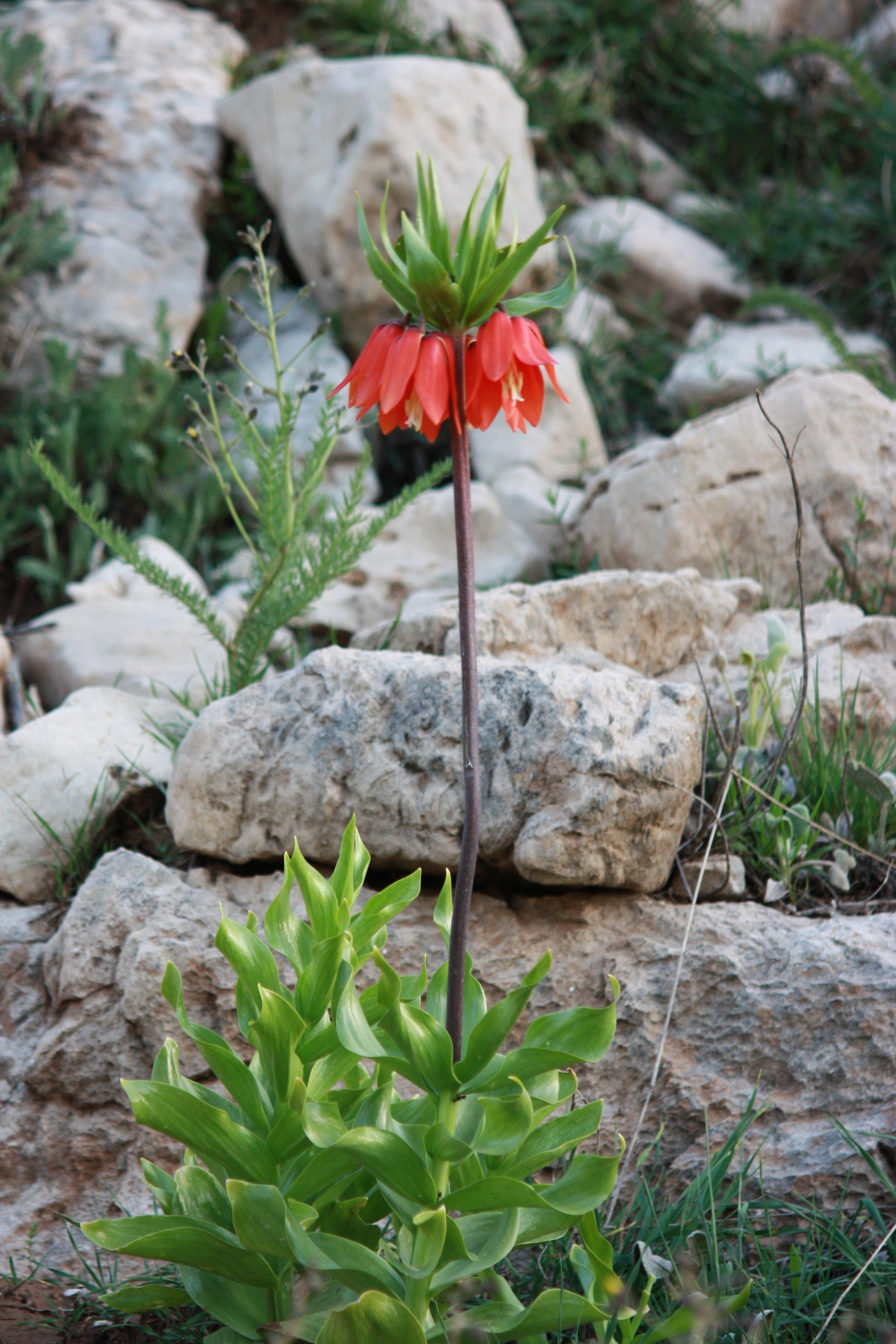
Fritillaria imperialis in Dena, Iranian Zagros

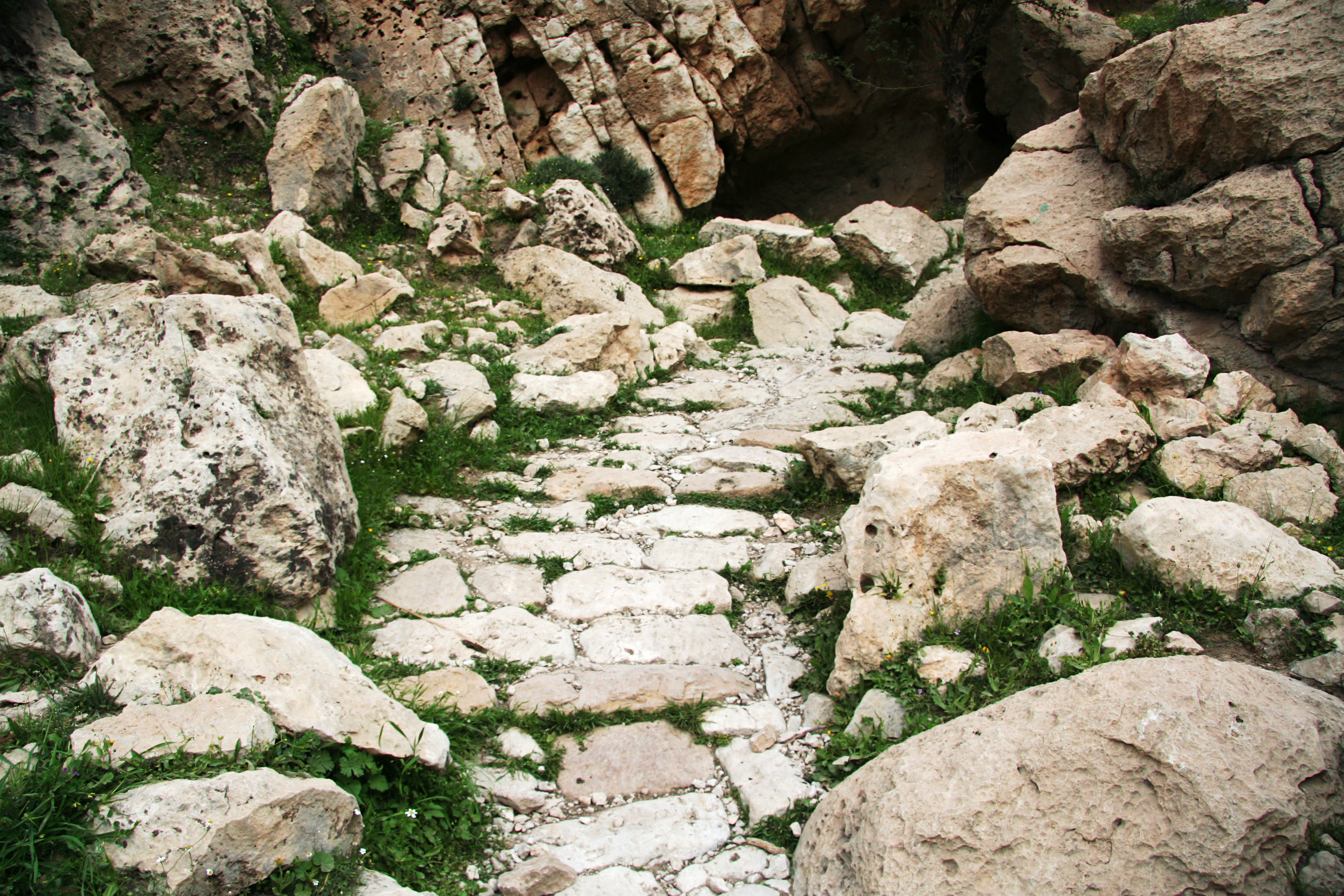
Ancient pathway in Zagros, Behbahan

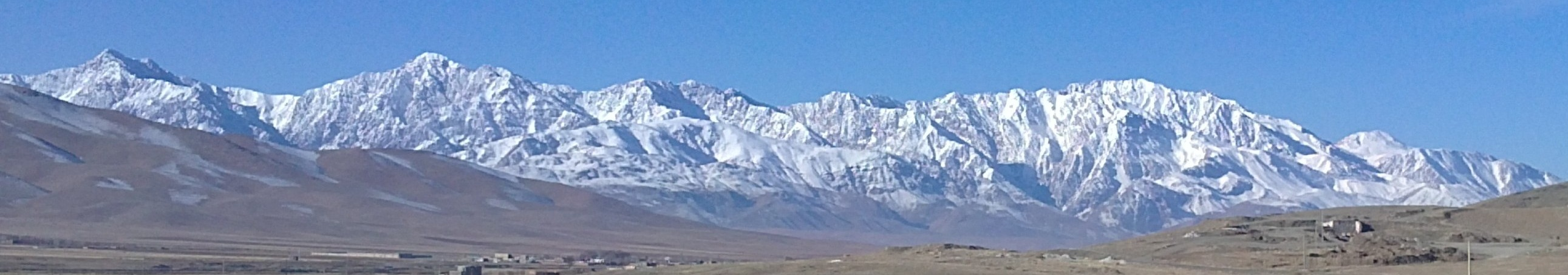
Mount Oshtorankuh

== See also ==
=== Parts of the Zagros Mountains ===
- Gardaneh ye Kuli Kash, mountain pass
- Mount Alvand
- Mount Arbaba
- Mount Derak
- Nalishkêne
- Qaleh gorikhteh

=== Other ===
- Alborz Mountains
- Al-Hajar Mountains, technically a continuation of the Zagros in the Arabian Peninsula
- Armenian highlands
- Battle of the Persian Gate
- Caucasus Mountains
- Corduene / Kurdistan
- Geography of Iran
- Geography of Iraq
- Geography of Turkey
- Iranian plateau
- Mountains of Ararat
- Mount Judi
- Silakhor Plain
- Tigris–Euphrates river system
