= Qal'eh Hasan Ali =

Maar-producing volcanic field in Kerman Province, Iran

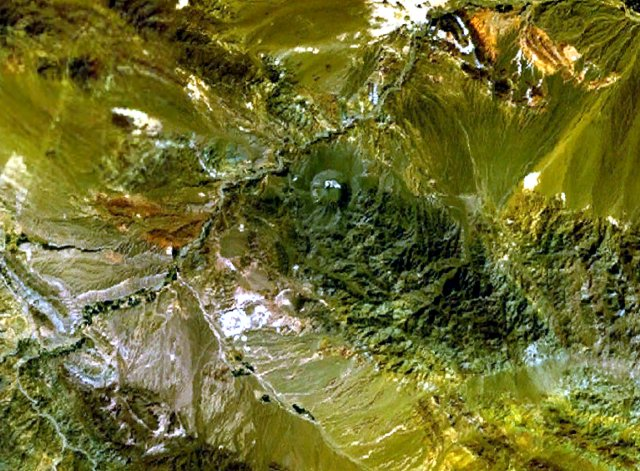
- NASA Landsat image (with north to the top)

Highest point
- Coordinates: 29°30′N 57°34′E

Geography
- Location within Iran
- Location: Kerman Province, Iran.

Geology
- Mountain type: Maars
- Last eruption: Unknown

Qal'eh Hasan Ali is a maar-producing volcanic field in Kerman Province, Iran. The field is presumed of Quaternary age, though it has produced no historic eruptions. Consisting of 14 maars each of different size, its most significant crater is Great Crater, about 1.2 kilometres (0.75 mi) in width and 200–300 metres (660–980 ft) in depth.

This volcanic field was originally considered to be a field of impact craters. The volcanism both of Qal'eh Hasan Ali and of several neighbouring volcanic centres is associated with a local fault zone. The general area of Iran has been affected by the collision of Arabia with Eurasia, resulting in volcanic activity.

== Geography and structure ==
Qal'eh Hasan Ali lies in the Kerman province of Iran, approximately 100 kilometres (62 mi) southeast of the city of Kerman. A village of the same name is close to the field. They were discovered during geological reconnaissance by geologists of the Yugoslav Institute for Geological and Mining Exploration and were originally considered to be impact craters.

Qal'eh Hasan Ali is part of the Urmiah-Dokhtar volcanic arc, specifically its southeastern segment. This volcanic arc extends along the Zagros mountain range and has been interpreted as being caused by subduction of the Neotethys, starting during the Triassic. Volcanism reached a peak during the Eocene. The volcanic succession of the arc reaches thicknesses of 4 kilometres (2.5 mi) in some places and is dominated by calc-alkaline rocks. Another volcanic arc in Iran is found in the Makran area and is formed by the Bazman, Taftan, and Koh-i-Sultan volcanoes, the latter of which lies in Pakistan. Other young volcanoes in Iran are the Bijar volcanic field, Damavand, and Sar'akhor. Activity in the arc diminished starting from 22 million years ago in its Armenian segment and ceased 6 million years ago. At the same time, the continent collision between Arabia and Eurasia occurred, starting from the northwest.

Qal'eh Hasan Ali consists of maars, and it covers an area of 150 square kilometres (58 sq mi). 14 craters are found within the field, two of which are separate from the rest of the group. The craters have diameters of 150–1,000 metres (490–3,280 ft) and depths up to 80 metres (260 ft); the largest crater ("Great Crater", 29°23′39″N 57°33′29″E) reaches a diameter of 1,200 metres (3,900 ft) and depth of 200–300 metres (660–980 ft); it also contains a salt pan. This crater has an altitude of about 2,300 metres (7,500 ft) above sea level. These craters are surrounded by rims of fragmentary rocks, which form beds with thicknesses of several centimetres. These beds have steep outward dips and much more gentle inward dips and are mostly constructed from country rock; only on two craters including the Great Crater has juvenile material been found. Some craters may have been affected by fumarolic activity, which has left sodium sulfate minerals such as mirabilite.

== Geology ==
Qal'eh Hasan Ali is part of a large orogenic province that was formed by the closures of the Paleotethys, Neotethys, and Sistan oceans as well as by ongoing subduction off the Makran area. The resulting collision of terranes and continents has formed the Iranian high plateau.

Volcanic activity in the region of the Lut commenced during the Jurassic and reached a peak at the end of the Eocene. After the Eocene, calc-alkaline volcanism diminished and mafic volcanism became dominant.

=== Local ===
The craters of Qal'eh Hasan Ali are constructed within a basement of Eocene volcanic rocks and granodiorite, with the exception of the two outlying craters, which are found in desert alluvium. Qal'eh Hasan Ali lies on the Lut block, over continental crust with a thickness exceeding 25 kilometres (16 mi).

Qal'eh Hasan Ali and several volcanic centres 215 kilometres (134 mi) and more farther north may be part of an alkaline volcanic province associated with the Nayband strike-slip fault, the projection of which crosses the Qal'eh Hasan Ali field. Volcanism along this fault has been K-Ar dated at 15.6–14.3 Mya in the north and 2.6–2.2 Mya farther south. This older volcanism is sodium-rich, however. The formation of magma at Qal'eh Hasan Ali ultimately might depend on either the ongoing subduction at the Makran arc or to pre-existent asthenospheric processes.

=== Composition ===
Tephrites have been found at Qal'eh Hasan Ali, as well as basanite and an augite-phlogopite cumulate. The tephrites contain analcime, anorthoclase, clinopyroxene, hauyne, magnetite, olivine, phlogopite, and pyroxene dominated by augite and lesser aegirine. Xenoliths have also been found at the Great Crater vent, including probably magmatic calcite. Apatite is present at the Great Crater as well.

The composition of Qal'eh Hasan Ali rocks has been compared to kamafugite and lamproite. Overall, rocks erupted in the field are considered to be alkaline rocks, with very high potassium content as is found in volcanic rocks that were erupted along the Alpide belt after the continental collision. The magmas of the field probably formed in the lithosphere that had been affected by metasomatism. The existence of calcite within the rocks has indicated that carbonatites may be involved. The analyzed rocks are rich in sulfur. Based on the composition, the temperature of the magma was approximately 1,010–1,125 °C (1,850–2,057 °F).

== Eruptive history ==
Qal'eh Hasan Ali has been active during the Quaternary, the eruptions that formed the craters probably took place between 5,000 and 50,000 years ago. Potassium-argon dating on rocks from the Great Crater have indicated an age of 119,000–112,000 years. No SO_{2} has been detected in Pakistan that could be attributed to this field.

The eruptive activity that generated the craters was probably non-explosive, with fountaining. Maars are generally formed during phreatomagmatic activity from the interaction of water with magma. In the case of Qal'eh Hasan Ali, the water may have been supplied by groundwater from the neighbouring Rud-e-Sang Zard river.

== See also ==
- List of volcanoes in Iran
- List of volcanic fields

== Sources ==
- Pang, Kwan-Nang; Chung, Sun-Lin; Zarrinkoub, Mohammad Hossein; Wang, Fei; Kamenetsky, Vadim S.; Lee, Hao-Yang (28 August 2015). "Quaternary high-Mg ultrapotassic rocks from the Qal'eh Hasan Ali maars, southeastern Iran: petrogenesis and geodynamic implications". Contributions to Mineralogy and Petrology. 170 (3): 27. Bibcode:2015CoMP..170...27P. doi:10.1007/s00410-015-1183-y. S2CID 129828767.
- Saadat, S.; Stern, C.R.; Moradian, A. (August 2014). "Petrochemistry of ultrapotassic tephrites and associated cognate plutonic xenoliths with carbonatite affinities from the late Quaternary Qa'le Hasan Ali maars, central Iran". Journal of Asian Earth Sciences. 89: 108–122. Bibcode:2014JAESc..89..108S. doi:10.1016/j.jseaes.2014.03.021.
- Milton, D. J. (September 1977). "Qal'eh hasan ali maars, central Iran". Bulletin Volcanologique. 40 (3): 201–208. Bibcode:1977BVol...40..201M. doi:10.1007/BF02597000. S2CID 129545531.
- Chiu, Han-Yi; Chung, Sun-Lin; Zarrinkoub, Mohammad Hossein; Mohammadi, Seyyed Saeid; Khatib, Mohammad Mahdi; Iizuka, Yoshiyuki (March 2013). "Zircon U–Pb age constraints from Iran on the magmatic evolution related to Neotethyan subduction and Zagros orogeny". Lithos. 162–163: 85. Bibcode:2013Litho.162...70C. doi:10.1016/j.lithos.2013.01.006.
