= List of volcanoes in Iran =

This is a list of active and extinct Volcanoes in Iran.

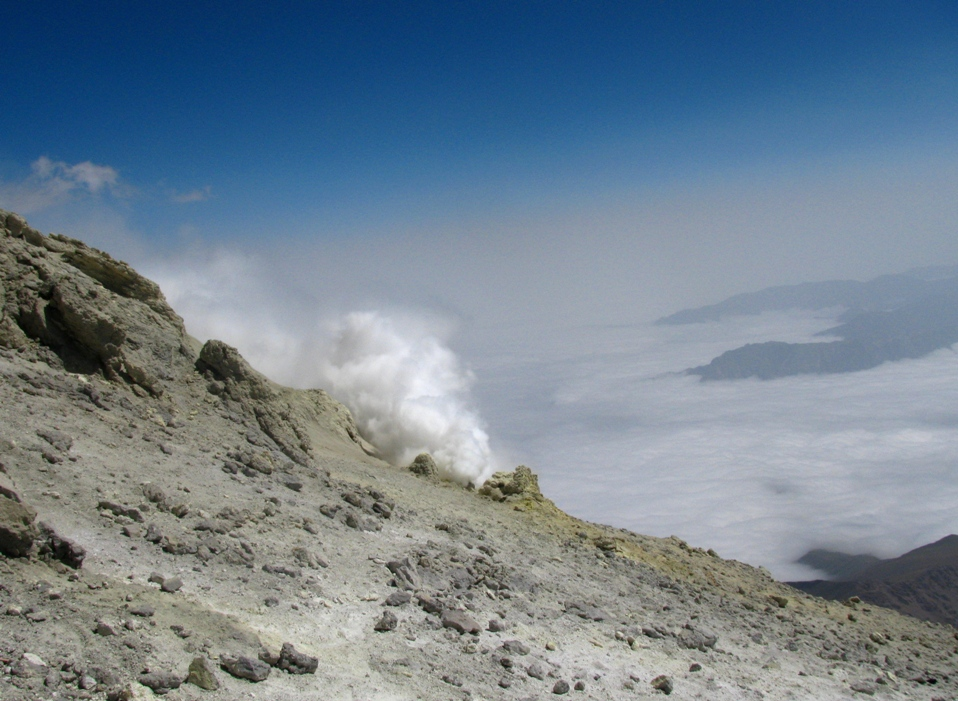
A fumarole near the summit of Damavand, emitting sulfur

| Name | Photograph | Elevation | | Location | Last eruption |
| Name | Photograph | meters | feet | Coordinates | Last eruption |
|---|---|---|---|---|---|
| Bazman | | 3,600 | 11,808 | 28.07°N 60.00°E | c. 41,000 years ago |
| Damavand | Damavand (5,625 m) | 5776 | 18,945 | 35.951°N 52.109°E | Holocene, from ca. 60 Ka to 7 Ka |
| Qal'eh Hasan Ali | | 4225 | 13,858 | 29.40°N 57.57°E | Holocene |
| Sabalan | Mount Sabalan in July 2006 | 4900 | 16,072 | 38.25°N 47.92°E | Holocene |
| Sahand | NASA Space Shuttle image. | 3844 | 12,608 | 37.75°N 46.43°E | Holocene |
| Sar'akhor | Sarakor | 3625 | 11,890 | | Pliocene |
| Taftan | | 3969 | 13,018 | 28.60°N 61.13°E | 1993? |
| Shahsavaran | Koh-E-Savaran | 2500 | 8200 | 28.17°N 59.1°E | Pleistocene |
| Gandom Beryan | | 500 | 1,640 | 31.343°N 57.517°E | Pliocene–Pleistocene |
| Nader | | 1,500 | 4,921 | 28.17°N 60.67°E | Quaternary |

== See also ==
- List of mountains in Iran
- Volcanic Seven Summits
