= Shahsavaran (volcanic field) =

Volcanic field in Iran

Coordinates: 28.17°N 59.1°E

Shahsavaran is a volcanic field in Iran. It covers an ellipse-shaped area west of Bazman volcano. The field has erupted lava cones and lava flows, along with some explosive volcanic activity, especially in the eastern part of the field. Volcanic rocks in the field are dominated by andesite, with subordinate basalt, dacite, and rhyodacite. The volcanism has lasted from 12 million years ago to recent times. The 2010 Hosseinabad earthquake took place within the field but seems to be unrelated to volcanic activity.

== Geology and geography ==
The field has a surface area of 60 by 120 kilometres (37 mi × 75 mi), with the shape of an ellipse. This ellipse "points" to the volcanic arc formed by the Bazman, Taftan, and Koh-i-Sultan volcanic arc.

The field features well-preserved lava cones, associated with lava flows. The basal basaltic lava flows are interlayered with volcanic debris and more silicic lava flows. To a more recent phase of volcanism belong andesitic centres, some of which lie on river terraces and form easily recognizable coulees. Explosive activity has also left ignimbrites and pumices; such explosive activity took place in the eastern part of the field towards Bazman volcano and was accompanied by the formation of nuee ardente breccia.

=== Petrology and petrogenesis ===
The field has erupted basalt, which forms several 1-kilometre-long (0.62 mi) lava flows in the basal units of the field. Andesites form the bulk of the products with subordinate dacites, as well as some rhyodacites which are found in the eastern part of the field, where the explosive activity took place. The dacites are found in the eastern part of the field. The rocks are porphyritic and follow the calc-alkaline trend, except for the basalts, which are of the aluminum-rich variety. Elemental composition is typical for island arc volcanoes, although strontium content is rather high. The rocks contain phenocrysts of clinopyroxene, orthopyroxene, and plagioclase. Amphibole and olivine are also found in the rocks. Some rocks have a glassy composition. These rocks probably formed by subduction of oceanic crust and the interaction of anatexis products thereof with above-lying mantle, with some fractionation of the subsequently formed magma. The basement of the area is formed by even older (Oligocene-Eocene) volcanic rocks that contain intrusions of granodiorite.

=== Geologic history ===
The field is of Tertiary-Quaternary age. Pliocene-Quaternary volcanism also took place north of the field where it borders the Lut; a large basaltic coulee of that age is found there and extends from a well-preserved volcanic centre. Volcanic activity commenced 12 million years ago and continued until historical times, according to unpublished data by G. Conrad. A minor earthquake occurred on 20 December 2010 of magnitude 6.5 in the field, the 2010 Hosseinabad earthquake. A second earthquake of magnitude 6.2 occurred not far away on 27 January 2011. Little seismic activity is otherwise associated with the field, and few faults have been identified there. The formation of fractures in the ground accompanied this seismic activity. These earthquakes occurred at depths of 6 kilometres (3.7 mi) and 9 kilometres (5.6 mi), respectively. The earthquake activity however does appear to be independent from any volcanic activity in the area, although the faults associated with this earthquake may influence the position of vents in the field.

=== Geological context ===
Bazman volcano lies east of this field and is sometimes included in analyses of the field. Tectonically, the field is located between the Makran mountains in the south, a range formed by Paleocene flysch and older ophiolites, and the Lut block in the north, which is a crustal block of Paleozoic-Mesozoic age that is buried beneath more recent sedimentary and volcanic rocks. To the south lies also the Jaz Murian depression. To the west, the field is delimited by the Nayband fault. The field is in the Central Iranian volcanic belt, a mountain range with summits exceeding 4,000 metres (13,000 ft) of altitude. In this belt, volcanic activity commenced during the Cretaceous as submarine volcanism. A peak of activity occurred during the Eocene; afterwards, andesitic-dacitic stratovolcanoes were formed during the Pliocene-Pleistocene. This volcanism may be associated either with a crustal weakness zone or subduction along the Zagros. Iran has two other volcanic belts, one associated with the Alborz and another at the Lut. Tectonic processes in Iran are ultimately dependent on the northward movement of the Arabian Plate with respect to the Eurasian Plate.

== See also ==
- List of volcanic fields

== Sources ==
- Dupuy, C.; Dostal, J. (December 1978). "Geochemistry of calc-alkaline volcanic rocks from southeastern Iran (kouh-e-shahsavaran)". Journal of Volcanology and Geothermal Research. 4 (3–4): 363–373. Bibcode:1978JVGR....4..363D. doi:10.1016/0377-0273(78)90022-7.
- Girod, M.; Conrad, G. (December 1975). "Les formations volcaniques récentes du Sud de l'Iran (Kouh-e-Shahsavaran): données pétrologiques préliminaires; implications structurales". Bulletin Volcanologique (in French). 39 (4): 495–511. Bibcode:1975BVol...39..495G. doi:10.1007/BF02596972. S2CID 127800346.
- Walker, R. T.; Bergman, E. A.; Elliott, J. R.; Fielding, E. J.; Ghods, A.- R.; Ghoraishi, M.; Jackson, J.; Nazari, H.; Nemati, M.; Oveisi, B.; Talebian, M.; Walters, R. J. (18 January 2013). "The 2010-2011 South Rigan (Baluchestan) earthquake sequence and its implications for distributed deformation and earthquake hazard in southeast Iran". Geophysical Journal International. 193 (1): 349–374. doi:10.1093/gji/ggs109.
