= Bazman =

Volcanic mountain in Iran

- Location within Iran

Highest point
- Elevation: 3,490 m (11,450 ft)
- Prominence: 2,400 m (7,900 ft)
- Listing: Ultra
- Coordinates: 28°07′N 60°00′E

Geography
- Location: Sistan and Baluchestan Province, Iran

Geology
- Mountain type: Stratovolcano
- Last eruption: c. 41,000 years ago

Bazman (Persian: بزمان, also known as Kuh-e Bazman) is a dormant stratovolcano in a remote desert region of Sistan and Baluchestan Province in southeastern Iran. A 500-m-wide crater caps the summit of the dominantly andesitic-dacitic volcano, the flanks of which are covered by monogenetic centres especially to the northwest. Bazman is a geologically young volcano which formed mainly in the Quaternary, with the oldest dated rocks being 11.7 million years old and the youngest 0.6 million years. Although no historic eruptions have been reported from Bazman, it does contain fumaroles. Thus Bazman may be regarded as dormant, rather than extinct, volcano. Its satellite cones have been the source of basaltic lava flows.

Bazman volcano is part of a volcanic arc in southeastern Iran, the Makran volcanic arc. At this arc, shallow subduction has generated an arc of volcanic activity which includes Bazman, Taftan and Koh-i-Sultan volcanoes. Bazman has been affected by heavy erosion. The flanks of the volcano are covered with debris coming from the volcano. A Cretaceous pluton is also associated with Bazman and has been investigated for the possibility of mining.

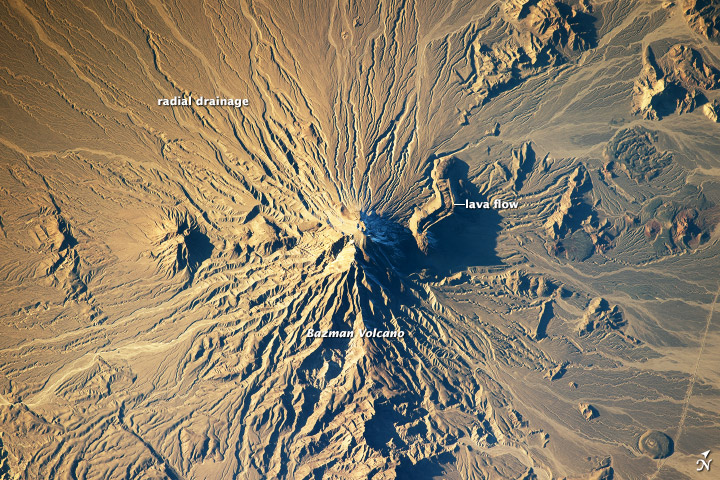
Bazman volcano ISS

== Geography and geology ==
Bazman is also known as Kuh-i-Zindeh ("Mountain of the Living One"), after a saint, Khizr-as-Sallam. Yet another name is Kuh-i-Naushada, although they are sometimes considered to be separate mountains. The mountain was climbed in 1896 by Percy Sykes and Brazier Creagh; by 1906 its volcanic nature was known to geologists. It is located 420 kilometres (260 mi) away from the Arabian Sea, and 120 kilometres (75 mi) north-northwest of Bampur.

=== Regional setting ===
Iran contains two major mountain ranges, the Alborz in northern Iran and Zagros in western Iran. Each range is associated with a major suture zone, the Alborz-Kopeh Dag and the Bitlis-Zagros sutures respectively. These mountain chains surround Central Iran, in whose southern part lies the Lut block and Bazman. Tectonically, southern central Iran does not follow the typical Alpide geological patterns insofar as faults are rare and the folds in the crust are broad. The Bazman area is covered by volcanic rocks of Tertiary age. The foreland of the mountain massifs such as the Bazman massif are affected by tectonic subsidence. A major Tertiary volcanic belt, analogous to the Indonesian volcanic arc, crosses Iran behind the Zagros. South of Bazman volcano lies the broad Jaz Murian depression. To the south of this depression the Makran area separates the Arabian Sea from inner Iran. The Makran area is geologically subdivided into the Inner Makran series which includes ophiolitic melange and the Coastal Makran Series. A phase of subduction commenced in the Cretaceous or Plio-Pleistocene, probably after earlier phases of subduction. This subduction has resulted in the formation of a volcanic complex including Bazman that stretches 150 kilometres (93 mi) east-west and reaches a width of 100 kilometres (62 mi), and is known as the Makran-Chagai magmatic arc. There is also earthquake activity including the 1945 Makran earthquake, but overall earthquake activity in the Makran is low, probably due to the effect of sediments in the trench. A large accretionary prism formed directly behind the trench, in the trench the subduction occurs at a pace of 2 centimetres per year (0.79 in/year). There is no evidence of a Wadati–Benioff zone beneath the Makran and subduction occurs at a shallow angle. Bazman has been grouped with Taftan volcano also in Iran and Koh-i-Sultan in Pakistan, of which only Taftan is considered active, Kuh-e-Nader is another volcanic field in this arc. This arc is over 600 kilometres (370 mi) away from the trench, indicating that the subduction is very shallow. Within this arc, Bazman is located at the edge between the actual subduction and the continental collision zone. Bazman is also considered part of a 1,700 kilometres (1,100 mi) long volcanic belt named the Urumieh-Dokhtar or Sahand-Bazman belt that extends from northwest to southeast and is accompanied by Cenozoic volcanic rocks and plutons. Bazman is sometimes considered to be part of a volcanic complex with the neighbouring Shahsavaran volcanic field.

=== Local setting ===
Bazman is one among about nine volcanic centres in Iran that have had Quaternary eruptions. Other volcanoes are Damavand which is also Asia's highest volcano, Taftan, Qal'eh Hasan Ali, Sabalan and Sahand volcanoes. Most of these volcanoes are part of a volcanic belt named Dokhtar-Urmiah. With the exception of reports of possible lava flows at Taftan, none of these volcanoes have been reportedly active during historical times. Older volcanic activity within this belt has generated a number of copper porphyry deposits.

Bazman volcano is 3,500 metres (11,500 ft) high, rising high above the surrounding terrain, and has steep slopes. At the top of the volcano lies a summit crater. This crater is well conserved and it has a diameter of 500 metres (1,600 ft). On the north flank, a northbound lava flow with prominent levees that eventually splits into a northwestern and northeastern arm was discharged by a steep lava cone that is known as Bazman Bacheh ("Bazman's Child") and lies 3 kilometres (1.9 mi) northeast of the summit. Other viscous lava flows have been erupted from satellite cones, which occur mainly at distances of 10–20 kilometres (6.2–12.4 mi) northeast from the summit. In total the volcano covers an area of about 300 square kilometres (120 sq mi). The volcano is constructed on top of the Lut block, which reaches a thickness of 40 kilometres (25 mi). Quaternary sediments are buried beneath Bazman's eruption products. The Moho beneath Bazman is approximately 48–50 kilometres (30–31 mi) deep. The area around Bazman is remote.

A field of monogenetic volcanoes is found northwest of Bazman. These include broad and shallow craters with diameters of 800 metres (2,600 ft) with pyroclastic rocks, cryptodomes with diameters of up to 3 kilometres (1.9 mi) and heights of 75 metres (246 ft), scoria cones reaching a height of 300 metres (980 ft) with lava flow fields and individual lava flows. The varying state of erosion of these volcanoes indicates they formed over many millennia; some have been worn down to their feeding dykes.

Bazman has no recorded historical eruptions but fumarolic activity has been reported, as well as ongoing surface deformation. Bazman is considered to be occasionally smoking. Hot springs containing iron and sulfur are other signs of ongoing volcanism; Bazman has been considered a potential site for development of geothermal energy, with a surface area of 8,356 square kilometres (3,226 sq mi). In 1960, Bazman together with Taftan was considered a volcano with sporadic historic activity, while a different report in 1975 considered the volcano extinct. Potassium-argon dating of basalts from the volcano has yielded ages of 4.6 and 0.6 million years ago. These dates were obtained on the monogenetic cones; zircons directly from Bazman rocks are dated 7.5 ± 0.1 and 5.9 ± 0.2 million years ago by uranium-lead dating, along with other ages of 8–6 million years ago from other zircons around Bazman. A third date is of 11.7 million years ago. Another report in 1981 suggested that isotopic ages also indicate historic activity. Latest research indicates that the main Bazman volcano formed between 1.4 and 0.63 million years ago, with a preceding stage of regional volcanism between 8.6 and 4.1 million years ago. Later ignimbritic volcanism took place between 590,000 and 470,000 years ago; the final volcanic activity around the summit of the volcano continued until less than 41,000 years ago. An important geothermal field is associated with Bazman and hot springs occur south of the volcano; they might derive their heat source from it but the volcano features no fumaroles. Towns and in particular roads around the volcano could be threatened by lava flows, ash falls and nuee ardente emission, in case of renewed eruptions.

Bazman volcano is constructed by dacite, but andesite has also been mentioned. Minor amounts of rhyolite have also been reported. Overall rock samples range from basalt to rhyolite in composition and are mostly of calc-alkaline composition. The satellite cones have erupted olivine-containing basalts. The mountain's flanks are covered by a layer of detritus, burying most of the flanks to over 2,135 metres (7,005 ft) of altitude. Most of this detritus is erosional in nature, but pyroclastic rocks created by explosive activity and hot avalanches of extruded lava also contribute. 120 metres (390 ft) thick olivine basalt found in the Jaz Murian depression may also come from Bazman. Basalt has also been found at one cryptodome. North of Bazman, andesites of Miocene-Eocene age are partly buried beneath the volcano and there are also andesitic to dacitic intrusions. Carboniferous and Permian metamorphic rocks form the oldest basement at Bazman.

Petrological analysis at the monogenetic volcanoes around Bazman has indicated porphyritic basalts containing clinopyroxene, hornblende, olivine and plagioclase, and titanite and zircon as accessories. The rocks have medium potassium content, lower than that of Taftan and Koh-i-Sultan. This may reflect differences in the subduction beneath Bazman and the other two volcanoes. Composition data are typical of volcanic island arc rocks, with some samples have element ratios more akin to ocean island basalts. Lithosphere modified by the subduction may be the origin of the magmas that formed the monogenetic cones. On the basis of its composition, the environmental conditions under which one of the samples formed have been estimated, the temperature being c. 1,400 °C (2,550 °F) and a minimum depth of about 76 kilometres (47 mi). The magmas ultimately originate through partial melting from a stable heat source.

A mining area is associated with Bazman and more precisely with Paleozoic-Mesozoic rocks including a c. 70 million years old granite pluton. This late Cretaceous pluton is localized south of Bazman volcano. According to other reports its rocks are also exposed on the northern side of Bazman. The granite complex is partly buried by Bazman volcano. Various hydrothermal and skarn alterations have generated mineral deposits that include silver, gold, copper, lead, magnesium, molybdenum, and zinc, and minor amounts of tungsten and possibly of vanadium. The Chahnali epithermal gold deposit is close to the volcano.

The area of Bazman is affected by rain erosion. Sheet floods such as those that occurred in 1976 are principal agents. Together with other kinds of erosion such as frost and salt weathering, these have formed a pediplain terrain with inselbergs being left, especially where harder rocks are found. Pebbles eroded from Bazman have been transported to the terrains of the Jaz Murian depression south of Bazman. The effects of this erosion have mantled the volcano with debris locally known as "dasht", reaching distances of over 30 kilometres (19 mi) from the vent. With the exception of the Ziyarat valley on Bazman's southern flank, the area around Bazman is arid and uninhabited.

== Climate and environment ==
The 3,246.88 square kilometres (1,253.63 sq mi) Bazman protected area encompasses part of the volcano. Animal species recorded there include the Asian black bear, bustard, chinkara and sand cat.

== See also ==
- Geology of Iran
- List of volcanoes in Iran

== Sources ==
- "Bazman". Global Volcanism Program. Smithsonian Institution.
- Deshaee, Adnan; Shakeri, Ata; Taran, Yuri; Mehrabi, Behzad; Farhadian, Mahin; Zelenski, Michael; Chaplygin, Ilya; Tassi, Franco (15 January 2020). "Geochemistry of Bazman thermal springs, southeast Iran". Journal of Volcanology and Geothermal Research. 390 106676. Bibcode:2020JVGR..39006676D. doi:10.1016/j.jvolgeores.2019.106676. ISSN 0377-0273. S2CID 212982610.
- Delavari, Morteza; Mehrabi, Behzad; Zelenski, Michael; Chaplygin, Ilya; Nekrylov, Nikolai; Shakeri, Ata; Taran, Yuri (1 August 2022). "The Bazman and Taftan volcanoes of southern Iran: Implications for along-arc geochemical variation and magma storage conditions above the Makran low-angle subduction zone". Journal of Asian Earth Sciences. 233 105259. Bibcode:2022JAESc.23305259D. doi:10.1016/j.jseaes.2022.105259. ISSN 1367-9120. S2CID 248713167.
- Ghalamghash, J.; Schmitt, A. K.; Shiaian, K.; Jamal, R.; Chung, Sun-Lin (14 December 2018). "Magma origins and geodynamic implications for the Makran-Chagai arc from geochronology and geochemistry of Bazman volcano, southeastern Iran". Journal of Asian Earth Sciences. 171: 289–304. doi:10.1016/j.jseaes.2018.12.006. ISSN 1367-9120. S2CID 135419790.
- Morovati, Maryam; Karami, Peyman; Amjas, Fatemeh Bahadori (18 November 2020). "Accessing habitat suitability and connectivity for the westernmost population of Asian black bear (Ursus thibetanus gedrosianus, Blanford, 1877) based on climate changes scenarios in Iran". PLOS ONE. 15 (11) e0242432. Bibcode:2020PLoSO..1542432M. doi:10.1371/journal.pone.0242432. ISSN 1932-6203. PMC 7673494. PMID 33206701.
- Pang, Kwan-Nang; Chung, Sun-Lin; Zarrinkoub, Mohammad Hossein; Chiu, Han-Yi; Li, Xian-Hua (June 2014). "On the magmatic record of the Makran arc, southeastern Iran: Insights from zircon U-Pb geochronology and bulk-rock geochemistry". Geochemistry, Geophysics, Geosystems. 15 (6): 2151–2169. Bibcode:2014GGG....15.2151P. doi:10.1002/2014GC005262.
- Saadat, Saeed; Stern, Charles R. (July 2011). "Petrochemistry and genesis of olivine basalts from small monogenetic parasitic cones of Bazman stratovolcano, Makran arc, southeastern Iran". Lithos. 125 (1–2): 607–619. Bibcode:2011Litho.125..607S. doi:10.1016/j.lithos.2011.03.014.
- Shearman, D. J.; Walker, G. P. L.; Booth, B.; Falcon, N. L. (November 1976). "The Geological Evolution of Southern Iran: The Report of the Iranian Makran Expedition". The Geographical Journal. 142 (3): 393–410. doi:10.2307/1795293. JSTOR 1795293.
- Sholeh, Ali; Rastad, Ebrahim; Huston, David; Gemmell, J. Bruce; Taylor, Ryan D. (8 April 2016). "The Chahnaly Low-Sulfidation Epithermal Gold Deposit, Western Makran Volcanic Arc, Southeast Iran". Economic Geology. 111 (3): 619–639. doi:10.2113/econgeo.111.3.619.
- Weise, Otfried R. (November 1978). "Morphodynamics and Morphogenesis of Pediments in the Deserts of Iran". The Geographical Journal. 144 (3): 450–462. doi:10.2307/634821. JSTOR 634821.
