= 2010 Hosseinabad earthquake =

Earthquake in Iran

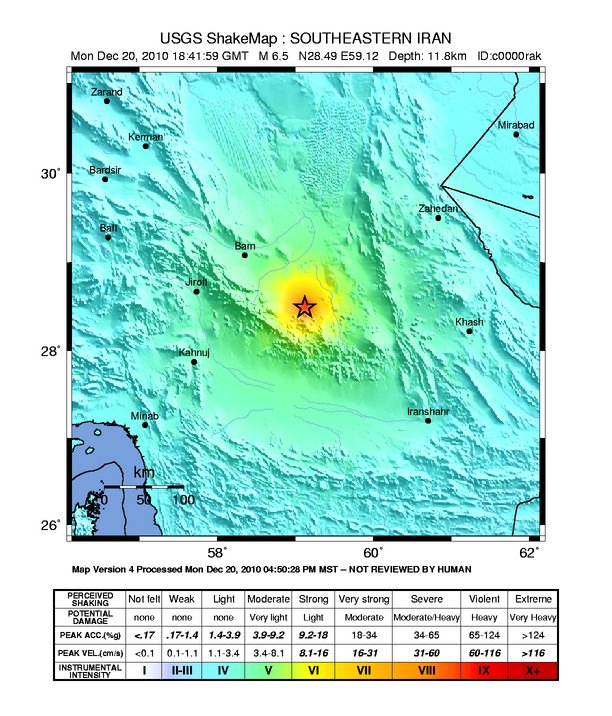
- USGS ShakeMap for the event

- Location within Iran
- UTC time: 2010-12-20 18:41:59
- ISC event: 15813625
- USGS-ANSS: ComCat
- Local date: December 20, 2010
- Local time: 22:11
- Magnitude: 6.6 M_{w}
- Depth: 15 km (9 mi)
- Epicenter: 28.38°N 59.15°E
- Areas affected: Iran
- Max. intensity: MMI VIII (Severe)
- Casualties: 11 people dead

The 2010 Hosseinabad earthquake occurred on December 20 at 22:11 local time (18:41 UTC) with a moment magnitude of 6.6 and a maximum Mercalli intensity of VIII (Severe). It was located about 20 km from Hosseinabad (spelled variously as Ḩoseynābād or Hosein Abad) (Persian: حسين آباد), Kermān Province in south-eastern Iran, about 100 km from Bam.

The earthquake killed eleven people and injured over 100. Damage was concentrated in about 20 villages in the area of Fahraj. Casualties were reported in the villages of Chah Qanbar, Tak Seyfeldini, and Sarze Rigan. Telephone service was interrupted and power outages were reported in the affected area. The intensity in Bam was IV (Light) and no damage was caused. It could also be felt in the province of Sistan-Baluchestan. According to the director of the Red Crescent of Iran, it is difficult to deliver humanitarian aid to some villages in the affected mountainous area. Some hard-to-reach areas were inaccessible due to being blocked by landslides.

Moderate earthquakes can cause serious damage in the Iranian countryside, where buildings are often made of mud-bricks.

== See also ==
- List of earthquakes in 2010
- List of earthquakes in Iran
- Shahsavaran (volcanic field)
