= Qaleh-ye Hoseyn Ali =

Village in Kerman, Iran

Qaleh-ye Hoseyn Ali قلعه حسين علي
- Village
- Location within Iran
- Coordinates: 29°23′46″N 57°32′17″E
- Country: Iran
- Province: Kerman
- County: Kerman
- Bakhsh: Rayen
- Rural District: Hoseynabad-e Goruh

Population (2006)
  - Total: 16
- Time zone: UTC+3:30 (IRST)
  - Summer (DST): UTC+4:30 (IRDT)

Qaleh-ye Hoseyn Ali (Persian: قلعه حسين علي, also Romanized as 'Qal‘eh-ye Ḩoseyn ‘Alī; also known as Qal‘eh Ḩasan ‘Alī, Qal‘eh-i-Hasan ‘Ali, and Qal‘eh-ye Ḩasan ‘Alī) is a village in Hoseynabad-e Goruh Rural District, Rayen District, Kerman County, Kerman Province, Iran. At the 2006 census, its population was 16, in 4 families.
