= Taftan (volcano) =

Volcanic mountain in Iran

- Koh-i-Taftan ("Mountain of Taftan"), The Boiling Mountain, Ziyārat. Koh-i-Chehaltan ("Mountain of the Forty Beings").
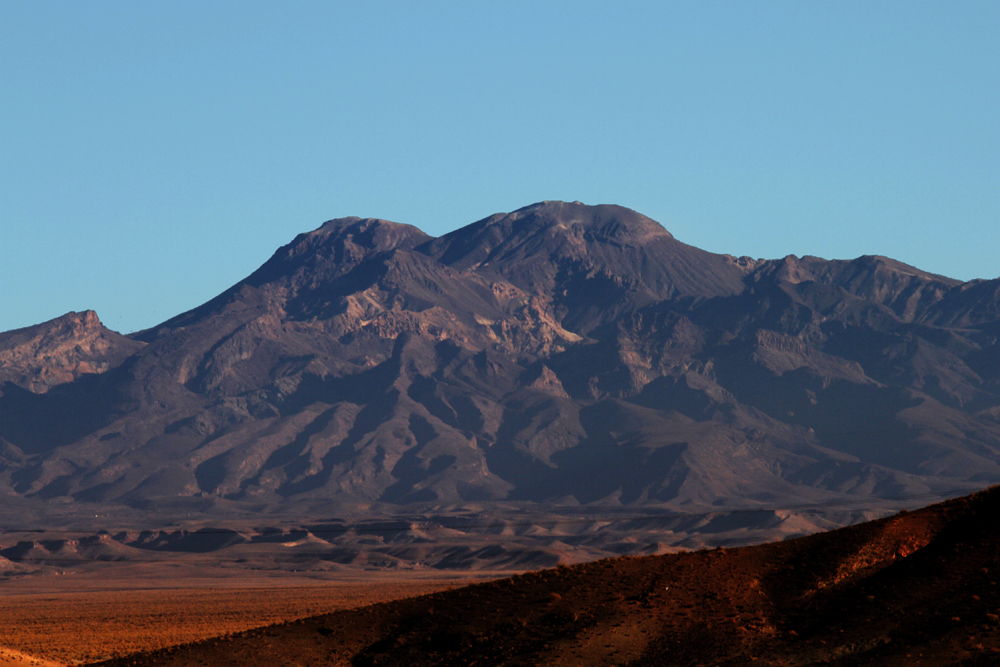

Highest point
- Elevation: 3,941 m (12,930 ft)
- Prominence: 2,901 m (9,518 ft); Ranked 109th
- Listing: Ultra
- Coordinates: 28°36′00″N 61°07′57″E

Naming
- English translation: The place of heat

Geography
- Location within Iran
- Location: Sistan and Baluchestan, Iran.

Geology
- Mountain type: Stratovolcano
- Last eruption: 710,000 BCE – 404,000 BCE

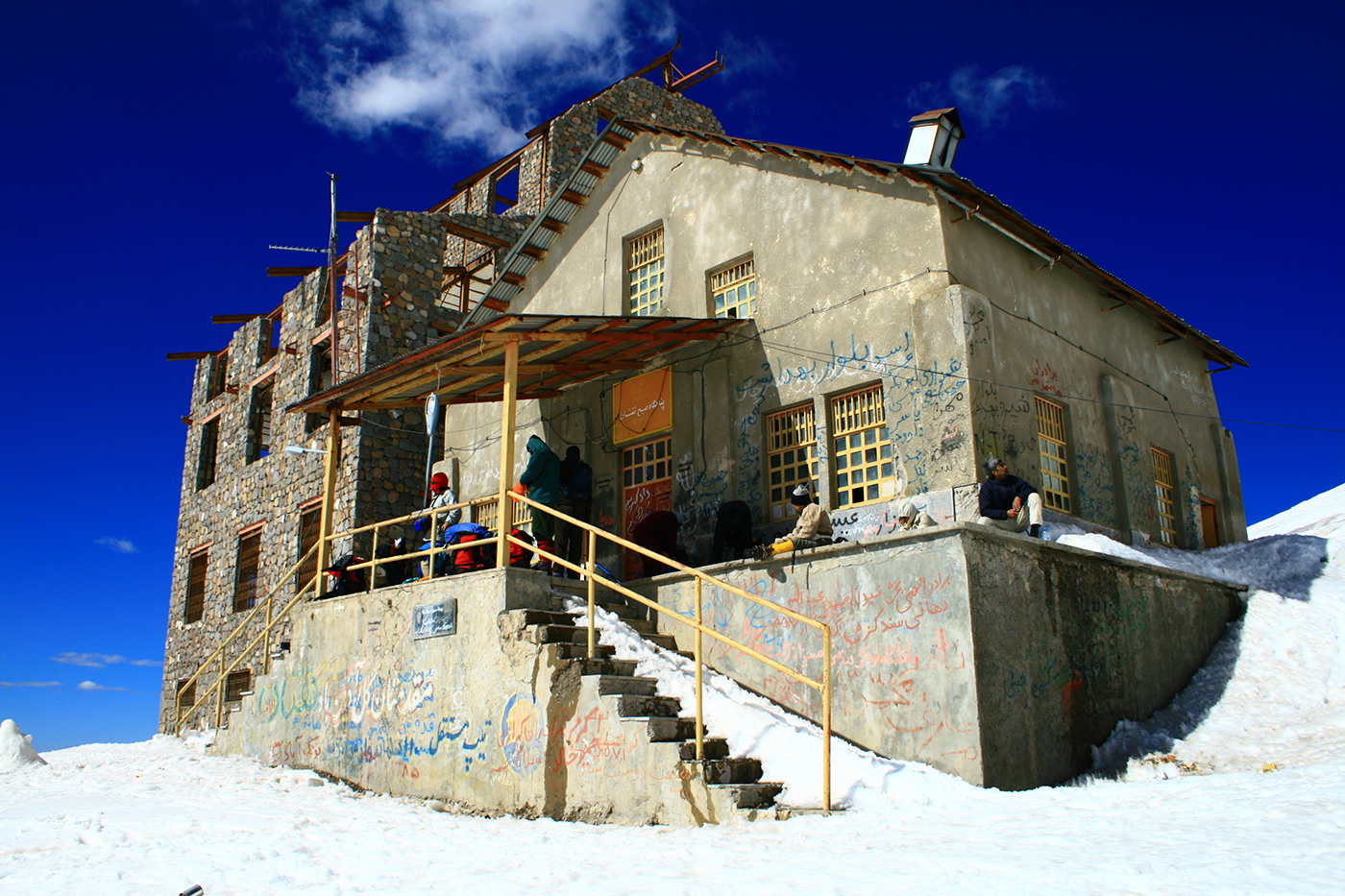
Shelter on Taftan

Taftan (Balochi: تپتان, Taptân, Persian: تفتان, Taftân, in Balochi and also Persian for "blistering, smoldering, fuming") is an active stratovolcano in south-eastern Iran in the Sistan and Baluchestan province. With variable heights reported, all around 4,000 metres (13,000 ft) above sea level, it is the highest mountain in south-eastern Iran. The nearest city is Khash.

Taftan has two main summits, Narkuh and Madehkuh, and various heights have been reported for both summits. The northwestern Narkuh has two craters and is the older of the two summits. The southeastern Madehkuh summit is surrounded by fresh-looking lava flows and has at least three craters. The principal rock at Taftan is andesite.

Reports of historical volcanic activity are unclear and the youngest radiometric dates are 6,950 ± 20 years before present. Currently, the volcano features vigorous fumarolic activity that is visible from a great distance and involves numerous vents on Materkuh. Taftan appears to be part of a geothermal area; there are a number of hot springs around the volcano.

Taftan is part of a volcanic arc in Iran, together with Bazman, also in Iran, and Koh-i-Sultan in Pakistan. This volcanic arc has formed on Cretaceous-Eocene sedimentary layers and has resulted from the subduction of the oceanic Arabian Plate beneath Iran at the Makran trench.

== Geography and geology ==
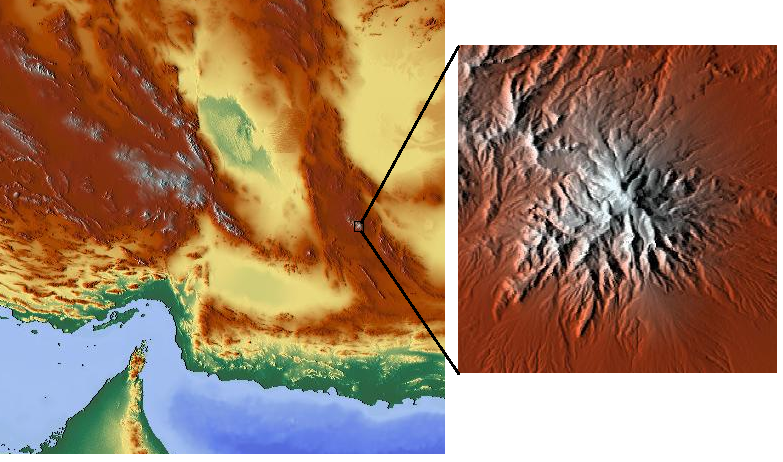
Taftan in Iran

Taftan is in Iran's Sistan and Balochistan province. Closest cities are Khash 45 kilometres (28 mi) south and Zahedan c. 100 kilometres (62 mi) north north-west. In 1844, Abdul-Nabi reported of the existence of the mountain, as well as its volcanic activity. In 1971, it was reported that some Beluch tribes camp on Taftan's slopes outside of winter.

=== Regional setting ===
Volcanic activity has occurred in parts of Iran since the Cretaceous period. During the Eocene and Oligocene epochs, volcanic activity reached its maximum, with thick pyroclastic layers being deposited in central Iran and the Alborz mountains. The area around Taftan volcano belongs to a tectonic zone which is variously referred to as the Sistan suture or the Zabul-Baloch zone. There, after a previous episode of rifting and subsequent formation of an ocean, the Neh and Lut tectonic blocks collided during the Eocene epoch after a subduction episode that commenced in the Maastrichtian age.

Volcanic activity at Taftan itself appears to relate to the subduction of the Arabian Plate beneath the Central Iran Plate, occurring at a pace of 2.5–3.0 centimetres per year (0.98–1.18 in/year) or 3.5–4.2 centimetres per year (1.4–1.7 in/year) at the Makran trench. This subduction is also responsible for volcanism at Bazman in Iran and Koh-i-Sultan in Pakistan; this chain is known as the Baluchistan volcanic arc. The volcanism appears to not align with pre-existent structural trends in the basement. This subduction has also created an accretionary wedge that forms the Makran region.

The convergence of the two blocks continued even after their collision, generating strike-slip faults. The Saravan fault east of Taftan is one such fault; the 2013 Saravan earthquake occurred on this fault. From some of these faults it has been inferred that the mass load from the Taftan edifice has measurable effects on tectonic stress within the region.

=== Local setting ===
Taftan is the highest mountain in southeast Iran. The topography is overall steep. Deep valleys with U and V shapes have developed on Taftan, and the volcano has a strongly eroded appearance. One of these valleys, Tamindan, may be the Damindan valley in the Avesta religious texts. One series of ignimbrites surrounding Taftan which reaches thicknesses of 50 metres (160 ft) and reaches distances of 15 kilometres (9.3 mi) from the edifice may be 2 million years old.

The basement of Taftan is formed by various sedimentary rocks, along with some mafic volcanic rocks and metamorphic rocks. At Taftan, the Nehbandan-Khash flysch borders the Makran zone. The oldest rocks are limestones from the Cretaceous period. The crust beneath Taftan is approximately 60 kilometres (37 mi) thick. The main edifice is constructed on top of the Eocene flysch, although some Cretaceous sediments are also part of the basement. Much of these rocks is coloured pink by haematite. The 19 mya old Mirabad granite pluton may be associated with Taftan; it could be the remnant of a Miocene volcano. Volcanic rocks of Quaternary age are widespread in the area.

Taftan is a volcano with several summits; the highest two are separated by a saddle and are named Narkuh, Narkooh or Narkouh and Materkuh, Madekooh or Madekouh, which are 2 kilometres (1.2 mi) apart. Narkuh is 4,100 metres (13,500 ft) high and Materkuh 3,950 metres (12,960 ft). There are different heights reported for the summits, some of them placing Materkuh as the higher of the two: for example more recent Iranian maps cited in 2004 show Narkuh with a height of 3,840 metres (12,600 ft) and Materkuh with a height of 3,940 metres (12,930 ft), while Gansser in 1964 indicated a summit height of 4,050 metres (13,290 ft). Another report from 1931 claimed a summit height of 3,973 metres (13,034 ft), a report in 1976 stated 4,032 metres (13,228 ft), and a map in 2004 claimed a measurement of 4,061 metres (13,323 ft). These summits rise 2,000 metres (6,600 ft) above the surrounding plains.

Narkuh has two craters, the northern of which is lower and is the source of more lava flows than the southern. The northwest Narkuh cone from the Pleistocene age is highly eroded, while the southeastern Materkuh cone has fresh appearing lava flows and displays solfataric activity. Materkuh has three principal craters, although the eastern side of the eastern crater has also been affected by erosion. Alternatively, an explosive eruption removed the eastern side and generated a steep ravine. The northern crater has been the source of lava flows, some of which are well preserved and reach lengths of 12 kilometres (7.5 mi). In general, thick andesitic lava flows cover Materkuh. In 1893 and 1914, Percy Sykes described a summit plateau with a surface of 370 metres (400 yd), at the side of which lay the two summits Ziaret Kuh ("Hill of Sacrifice", where pilgrims sacrificed goats) and Madar Kuh ("Mother Hill", containing fumaroles according to the 1893 report). Fumarolic alteration of the summit area has generated sulfur and clay deposits which resemble snow. One report in 1893 indicated that the summit area of the volcano was covered with ash from 3,400 metres (11,000 ft) upwards.

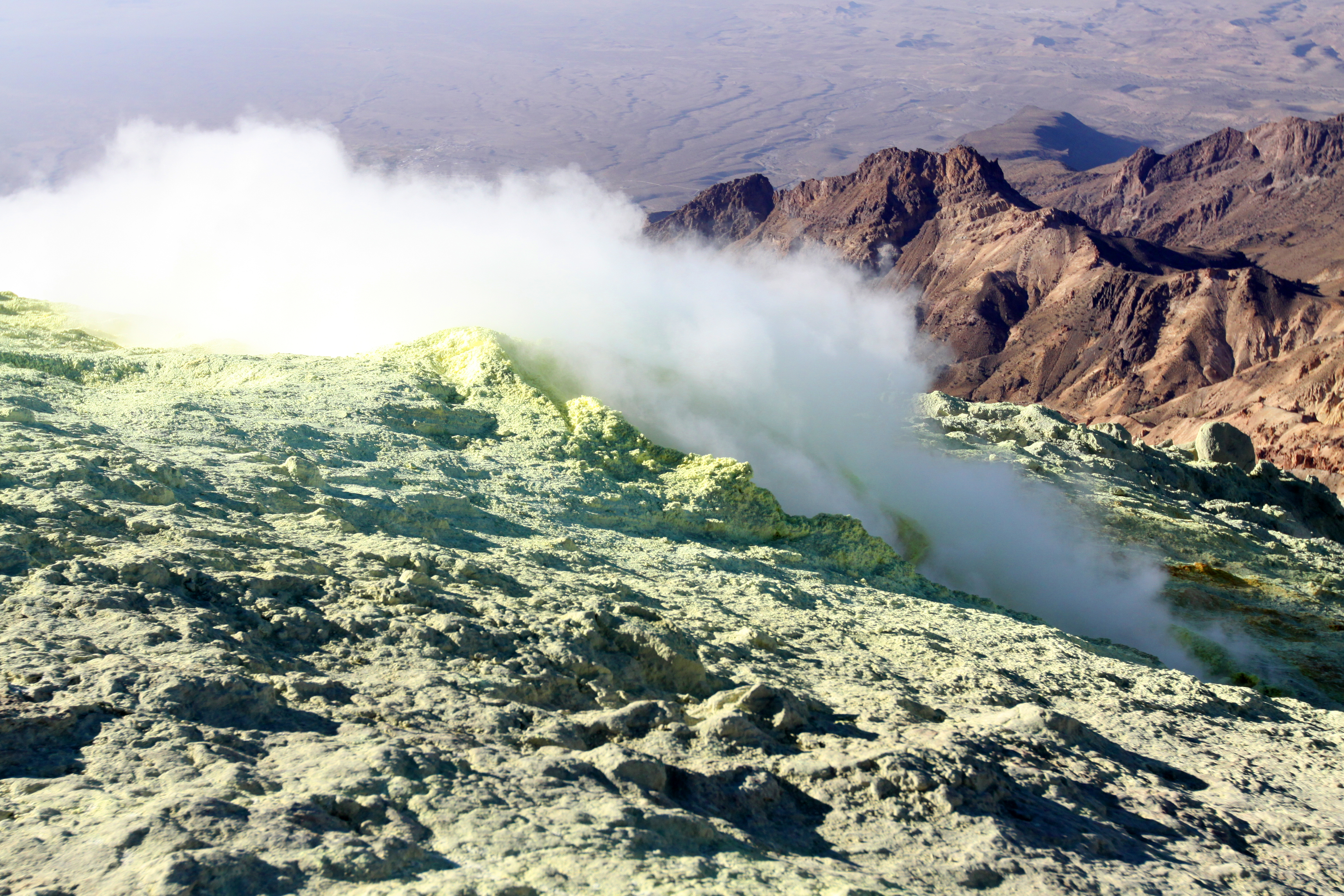
Taftan Summit, Sistan and Baluchestan province, Iran

The bulk of the volcano is formed by lava flows, along with volcaniclastic rocks, with dacites and pyroclastics lying on top of the Cretaceous-Eocene basement. These loose rocks formed by erosion, explosive activity and hot avalanches and are deposited in a large apron at the base of the volcano that extends over 30 kilometres (19 mi) away from the central vents. Several fans of pyroclastic material, cemented by andesitic tuffs, surround the base of Taftan. Ignimbrites and pyroclastic flows are also present, including breccias, nuee ardentes and tuffs. Volcanic rocks cover a surface of 1,050 square kilometres (410 sq mi). There is also evidence of southeastern migration of the craters of Taftan, with Anjerk and Sardarya being more westerly vents. These preceding centres have left andesitic lava flows that are partially dissected and agglomerates. The existence of a caldera at Taftan has been inferred. The table mountain Takht-i-Rostam 25 kilometres (16 mi) south of Taftan may be the remnant of a basalt extrusion, but it doesn't appear to be related to Taftan. A magma chamber may lie beneath the volcano.

=== Composition ===
Taftan has erupted lavas ranging from basaltic andesite to dacite. The dominant rock is andesite, with SiO_{2} content ranging from 49.8 to 63.5%. Grey andesites form the youngest rocks on the main summit and contain chlorite schist and biotite gneiss inclusions. The andesites are vesicular. The magma of Taftan volcano is very oxidized, as can be inferred from the composition of the surrounding ignimbrite and fumarole gases.

The lavas of Taftan are porphyritic. Mineral components include biotite, clinopyroxene, hornblende, orthopyroxene, plagioclase and quartz. Other components are chalcopyrite, haematite, ilmenite, magnetite and pyrite. Complex phenocryst assemblages found in a sample indicate that the magma formation is a complex process. Taftan rocks overall are potassium-rich calc-alkaline, of sub–alkaline affinity. The magma that formed these rocks was influenced by crystal fractionation and mixing processes. Magma storage occurs at 3.5–9 kilometres (2.2–5.6 mi) depth. Its composition has characteristics of volcanic arc magmas. Crustal materials were involved in the formation of the magma, with strontium isotope data indicating crustal assimilation.

Fumarolic activity affects surrounding rocks and pyroclastics. Carbonates, opal, and white covers of possibly aluminum sulfate and calcium sulfate have been formed. Gypsum formed from the sulfur of the volcano is found in the form of crystals in the upper valleys of Taftan. Sinter and hydrothermally altered rocks are found farther down. Minerals formed by alteration processes include alunite, calcite, cristobalite, illite, jarosite, kaolinite, pyrophyllite, quartz, smectite, sulfur and tridymite. Some epithermal mineralizations have been identified around Taftan. Other secondary factors at Taftan include lahars.

=== Eruptive history ===
About five different active eruption periods have been discovered at Taftan volcano. Activity first involved lava and pyroclastics of dacitic to rhyodacitic composition. Later, upper Pliocene lavas were erupted along with agglomerates. These can be found up to 10 kilometres (6.2 mi) away from the cone. Three phases have been dated at 6.95 ± 0.72, 6.01 ± 0.15 and 0.71 ± 0.03 million years ago; an even older phase west-northwest of the current volcano occurred 8 million years ago, while a Quaternary ignimbrite has produced an age of 404,000 ± 82,000 years before present. Other estimates put the volcano's last eruption at roughly 710,000 years ago. The youngest dates have been obtained on lava flows and indicate ages of 6,950 ± 20 years ago, by radiometric dating. Research published in 1897 indicated the absence of very fresh lava flows but the authors inferred from the fresh ash that volcanic activity had occurred during the present geological epoch. That the name "Taftan" may be derived from an ancient Iranian word "taft" for "semi solid liquid material" could indicate that effusive activity was witnessed by the people of that time period around the volcano.

It is not certain that there were any Holocene eruptions at Taftan, as clear evidence of such activity is missing. Eruptions are recorded in 1902, 1970 and 1993. A report of smoke emission in 1877 may have confused clouds for volcanic activity. In 1914, the volcano was described to be "belching out clouds of smoke", although a report in 1971 indicated the absence of historical activity. These eruptions were accompanied by earthquake activity. During the eruption of 1902, heavy smoke and a night time glow on the volcano were observed. The eruption in 1993 involved a c. 60 metres (200 ft) long lava flow, but it may have been a flow of molten sulfur. The volcano is currently classified as a dormant volcano. Satellite imagery indicates, however, that ground deformation occurs at Taftan and an increase of summit uplifting in July 2023 and fumarolic activity in May 2024 drew attention. Some of the uplift occurs at shallow depth and probably reflects hydrothermal system dynamics. Unofficial volcano hazard maps have been developed.

==== Fumarolic and geothermal activity ====
Taftan displays vigorous fumarolic activity, with high temperature vents found around the crater. Fumaroles are found chiefly in the eastern and at the edge of the western crater, with minor fumaroles within the western crater, along some minor craters and along the major lava flow. These gas exhalations are known as "Dood" by local peoples and they appear as yellow-white clouds with a strong smell. The vents they come from have the shape of fissures, cracks and crevices. The larger fumaroles can reach diameters of 1 metre (3 ft 3 in). The occurrence of hydrothermal explosions has been inferred from the presence of breccia made up by volcanic rocks.

Reportedly in 1897 the smell of the fumaroles was so strong as to be unbearable when one was close to the vents. Increased emissions are suspected to occur after precipitation events. One report mentioned in a magazine of 1899 indicated the presence of seven steam vents at an altitude of 3,700 metres (12,000 ft), produced audible noise. Their steam plumes were visible at distances of 16–24 kilometres (10–15 mi); later reporting indicated visibility to distances of 100 kilometres (62 mi). Another report in 1999 found a 1.5 by 5 metres (4 ft 11 in × 16 ft 5 in) solfatara surrounded by clay and sulfur deposits that looked like a snowcap. A fumarole field was described on the west side of the southeast cone, the venting clearly visible from a refuge farther down the mountain and covering a surface area of c. 10 square metres (110 sq ft). The name "Taftan" is derived from these exhalations, which make the mountain appear to be burning.

The overall gas composition found at Taftan includes CO_{2}, HCl, HF, H_{2}S, SO_{2} and water. Sulfur is present in high quantities in fumarolic gases, which also contain arsenic. These gases are hence extremely acidic. Taftan emits about twenty tons of sulfur dioxide per day. The fumaroles have altered rocks, forming highly colourful exposures especially on Taftan's eastern flank. Ammonium chloride (salmiak) and sulfur has been collected around fumaroles. The thick sulfur layers on the southeastern summit were formerly extracted for use in Iran and Pakistan. Sulfur and sulfate deposits are also found lower on the volcano, from hot springs around Gooshe, at Sangān and Torshāb.

Hot springs are also found at Taftan, especially at over 3,000 metres (9,800 ft) altitude. An analysis of five springs in May 2012 indicated temperatures of 11–56 °C (52–133 °F) and flow rates of 0.5–11 litres per second (0.018–0.388 cu ft/s). The waters are very acidic due to the formation of H_{2}SO_{4} from magmatic gases, including the oxidation of H_{2}S. The hot waters around Taftan contain large quantities of boron, probably because the hydrothermal system of Taftan is young and receives input of host rocks containing boron. They are influenced by the fumarolic gases, as well as by volcanic rock composition. Some of the water in the area is juvenile, with magmatic water forming up to 20% of the water. Temperatures in the hydrothermal system are estimated to be between 104–210 °C (219–410 °F) and 75–185 °C (167–365 °F). The composition of the water in various springs around Taftan varies in terms of elemental composition, probably reflecting the mixing between volcanic and meteoric waters and interaction with host rocks and brines. The geothermal area of Taftan is among the largest in the Makran zone of Iran; it covers a surface area of 4,310 square kilometres (1,660 sq mi). Other geothermal manifestations in southeastern Iran have been found at Bazman. Mud pools are also found at Taftan. Probably due to decreased precipitation, before 2002 a trend to increased steam and decreased water release has been observed, especially in the upper part of the geothermal system.

Hot springs and other geothermal manifestations are widespread in Iran and using them to gain geothermal energy has been studied; according to a report of 2002 hot springs at that time were mainly used for therapeutic purposes and bathing. A report in 2002 indicated that Taftan may be a feasible place to install a binary cycle power plant.

== Climate and vegetation ==
The climate at Taftan features cold winters accompanied by snowfall when temperatures drop below freezing between December and February, and hot summers with temperatures during July and August exceeding 30 °C (86 °F). Taftan is located in an arid locale but has more precipitation than the surrounding area, thus providing water to the surrounding terrain. Average precipitation is 150 millimetres (5.9 in) per year.

Owing to the height of the mountain, there are distinct vegetation belts at Taftan. The lowlands around the mountain are covered with Artemisia steppe and occasional shrubland. Open scrubs occur in a higher altitude belt of 1,800–2,500 metres (5,900–8,200 ft) where the terrain is rocky, and thorn-cushion vegetation at elevations of 2,600–3,700 metres (8,500–12,100 ft); there is little vegetation in the summit area. The summit of Taftan and several other Iranian volcanoes were deemed national natural monuments in 2002.

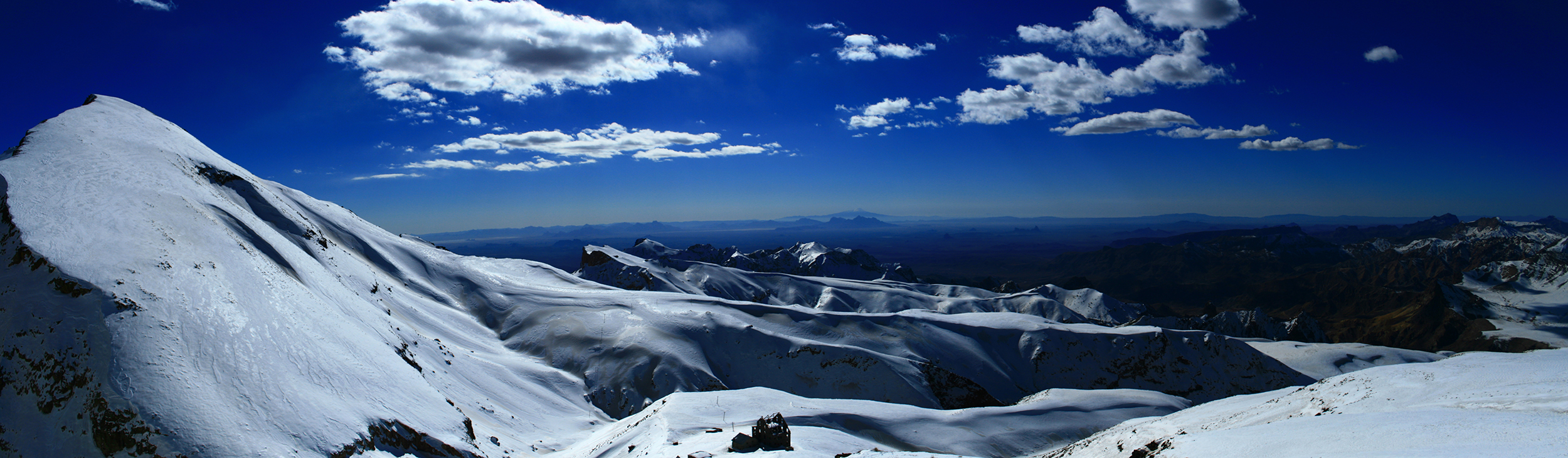
South view panorama in winter
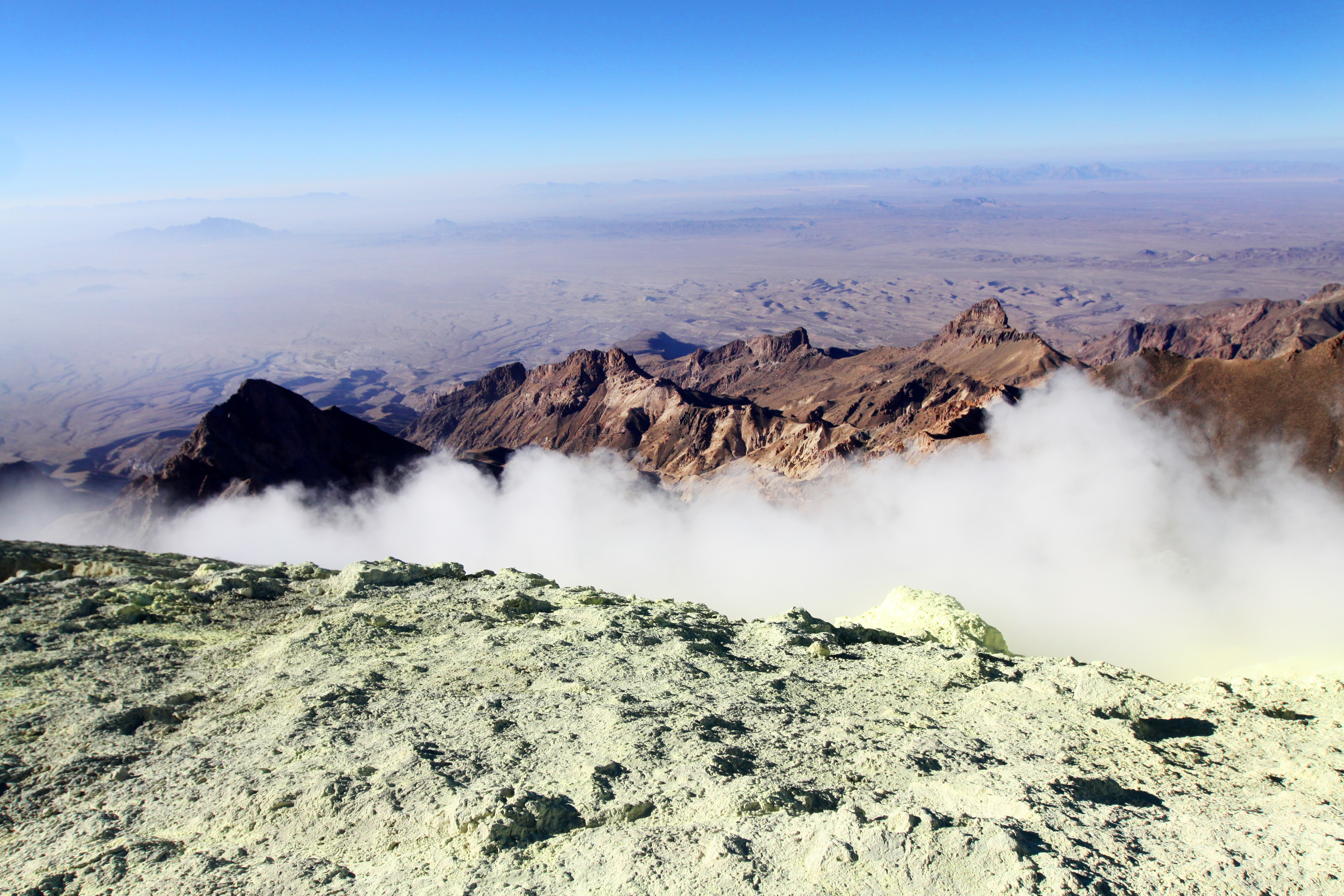
Taftan Summit, Sistan and Baluchestan province, Iran

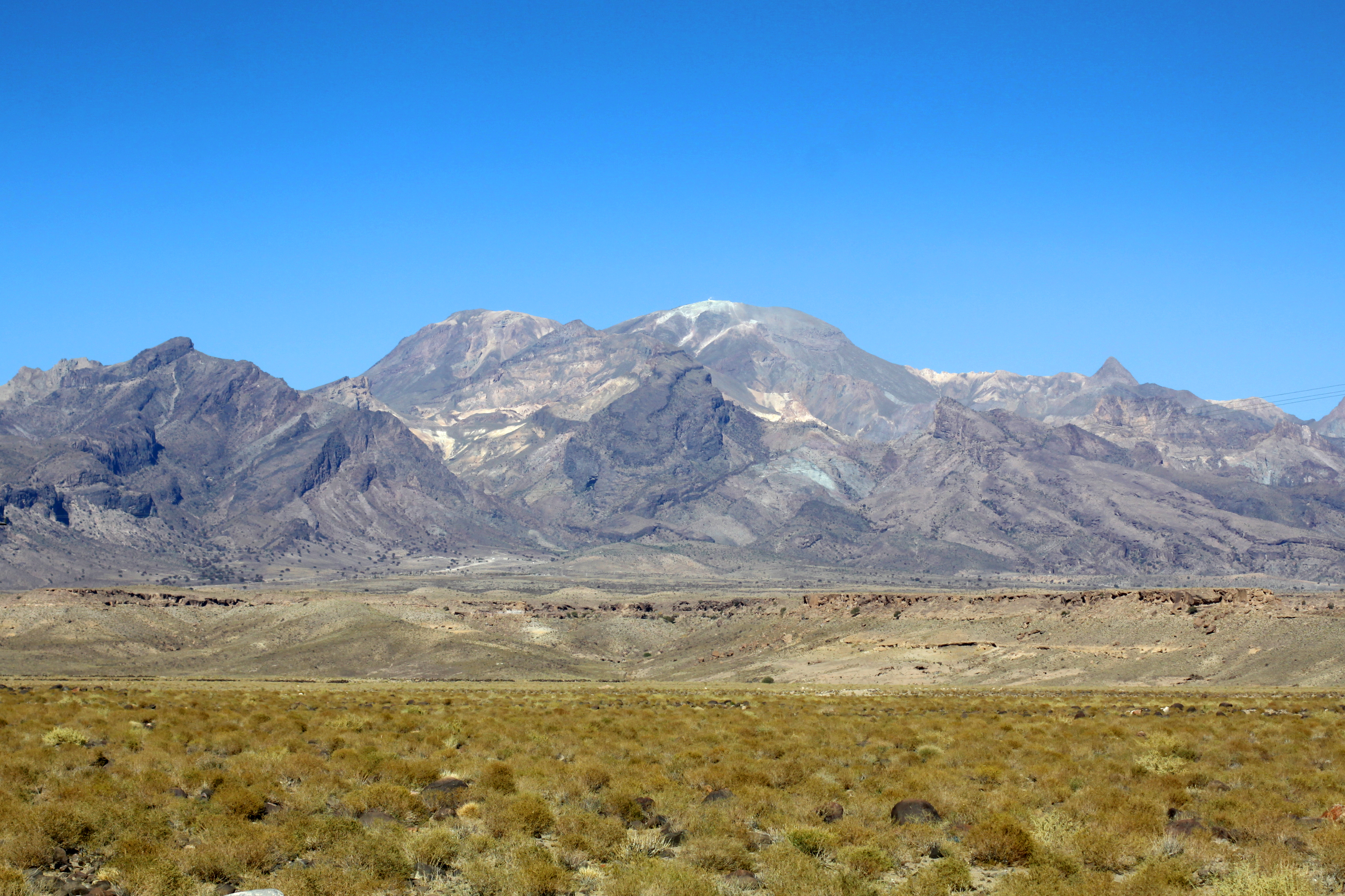
Mount Taftan, Sistan and Baluchestan province, Iran

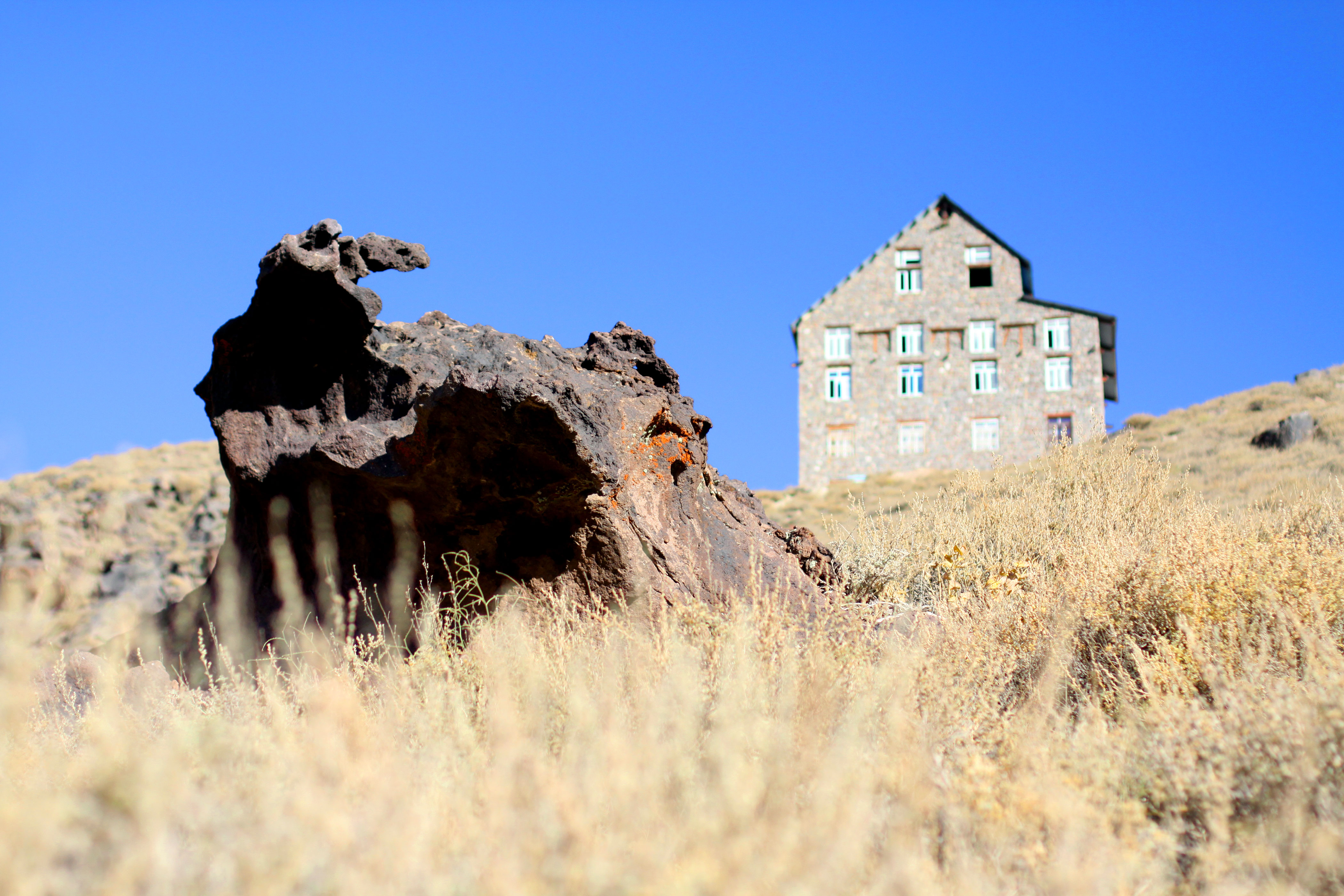
Taftan Shelter, Mount Taftan, Sistan and Baluchestan province, Iran

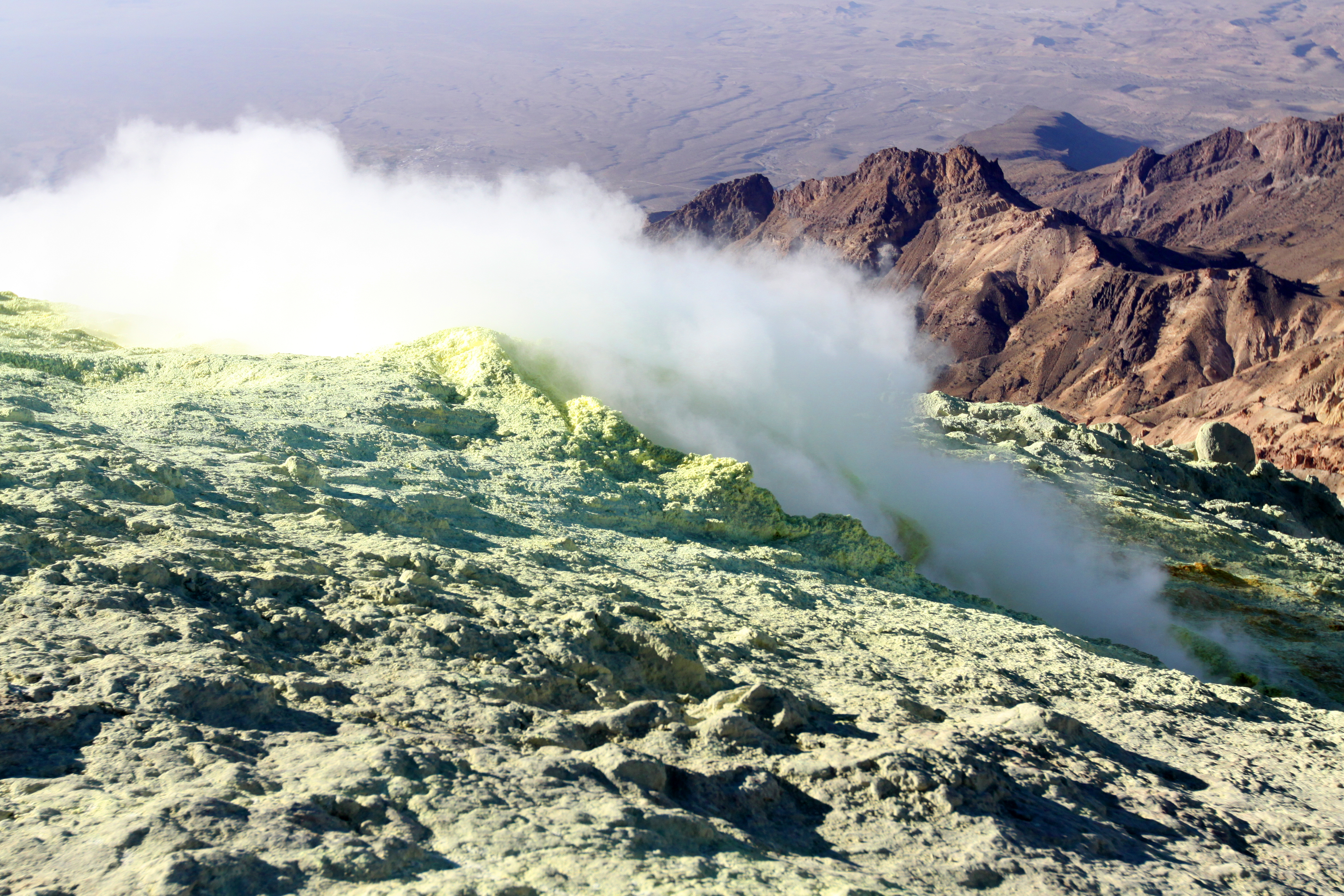
Taftan Summit, Sistan and Baluchestan province, Iran

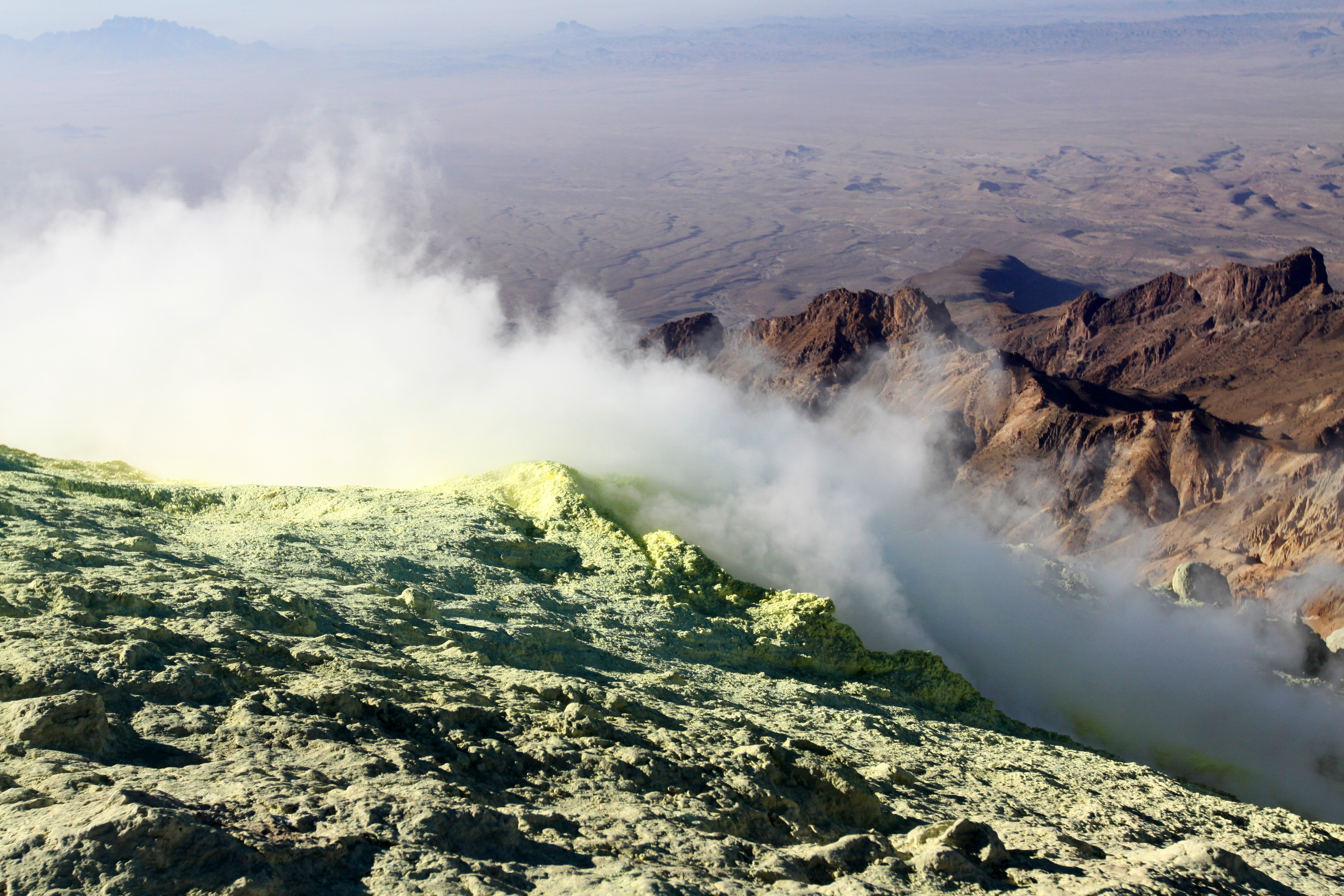
Taftan Summit, Sistan and Baluchestan province, Iran

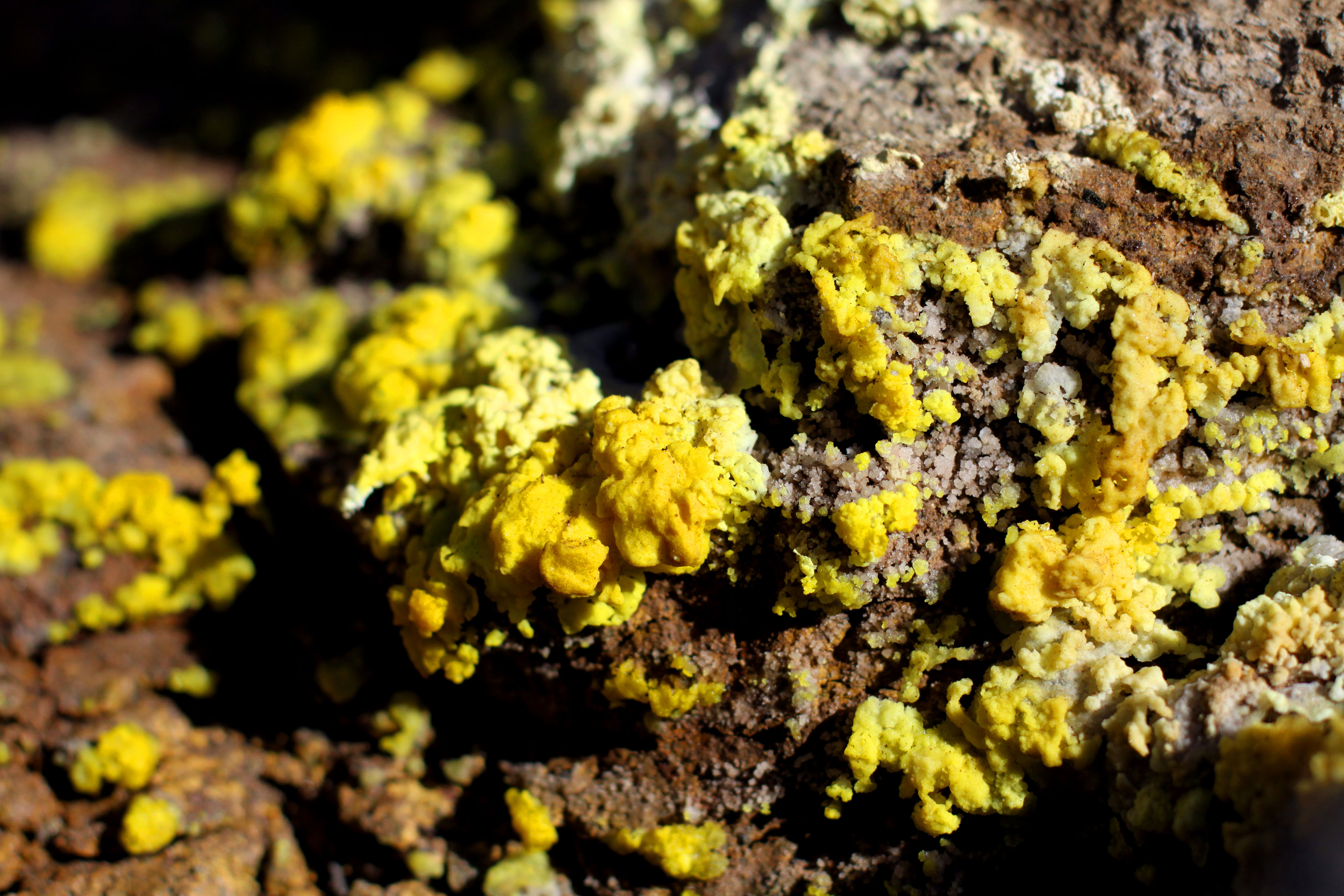
Sulfur, Taftan Mountain, Sistan and Baluchestan province, Iran

== See also ==
- List of volcanoes in Iran
- List of Ultras of West Asia

== Sources ==
- Akhoondzadeh, Mehdi (1 April 2025). "Monitoring of volcanic precursors using satellite data: the case of Taftan volcano in Iran". Journal of Applied Geodesy. 19 (2): 227–245. doi:10.1515/jag-2024-0049. ISSN 1862-9024.
- Biabangard, H.; Moradian, A. (26 November 2008). "Geology and geochemical evaluation of Taftan Volcano, Sistan and Baluchestan Province, southeast of Iran". Chinese Journal of Geochemistry. 27 (4): 356–369. doi:10.1007/s11631-008-0356-z. S2CID 140725289. ProQuest 204762376.
- Gansser, Augusto (August 1971). "The Taftan Volcano (SE Iran)". Eclogae Geologicae Helvetiae. 64 (2): 319–344. doi:10.5169/seals-163985.
- Ghazban, Fereydoun (2002). "Geological and Geothermal Investigation of Mount Taftan, SE Iran" (PDF). Geothermal Resources Council Transactions. 26 (Geothermal Energy: The Baseload Renewable Resource): 809–814. ISBN 978-0-934412-86-5. ISSN 0193-5933. Archived from the original (PDF) on 14 August 2016.
- Ghazban, Fereydoun (2004). "Alteration and Geochemistry of Mount Taftan Geothermal Prospect Southeastern Iran" (PDF). Iranian International Journal of Science. 5 (1): 43–62. Archived from the original (PDF) on 21 September 2016.
- Khaiatzadeh, Ahmad; Abbasnejad, Ahmad; Ranjbar, Hojatallah (2016). "TEPHRA, LAVA FLOW AND NUEE ARDENTE HAZARD ZONING OF TAFTAN VOLCANO, SE IRAN" (PDF). Geography and Environmental Hazards. 5 (18).
- Mohammadnia, Mohammadhossein; Yip, Man Wai; Webb, A. Alexander G.; González, Pablo J. (16 October 2025). "Spontaneous Transient Summit Uplift at Taftan Volcano (Makran Subduction Arc) Imaged Using an InSAR Common‐Mode Filtering Method". Geophysical Research Letters. 52 (19). doi:10.1029/2025GL114853.
- Richards, Jeremy P.; Razavi, Amir M.; Spell, Terry L.; Locock, Andrew; Sholeh, Ali; Aghazadeh, Mehraj (February 2018). "Magmatic evolution and porphyry–epithermal mineralization in the Taftan volcanic complex, southeastern Iran". Ore Geology Reviews. 95: 258–279. Bibcode:2018OGRv...95..258R. doi:10.1016/j.oregeorev.2018.02.018.
- Saadat, Saeed; Stern, Charles R. (July 2011). "Petrochemistry and genesis of olivine basalts from small monogenetic parasitic cones of Bazman stratovolcano, Makran arc, southeastern Iran". Lithos. 125 (1–2): 607–619. Bibcode:2011Litho.125..607S. doi:10.1016/j.lithos.2011.03.014.
- Sadeghi, Pouya; Khatib, Mohammad Mahdi; Moridi, Ali Asghar; Bagheri, Sasan (21 November 2015). "3D Mechanical modeling of faults planes based on stress fields: a case study of Saravan fault, SE Iran". Modeling Earth Systems and Environment. 1 (4): 44. Bibcode:2015MESE....1...44S. doi:10.1007/s40808-015-0046-x. S2CID 113297467.
- Shakeri, Ata; Moore, Farid; Kompani-Zare, Mazda (December 2008). "Geochemistry of the thermal springs of Mount Taftan, southeastern Iran". Journal of Volcanology and Geothermal Research. 178 (4): 829–836. Bibcode:2008JVGR..178..829S. doi:10.1016/j.jvolgeores.2008.05.001.
- Shakeri, Ata; Ghoreyshinia, Sayedkazem; Mehrabi, Behzad; Delavari, Morteza (October 2015). "Rare earth elements geochemistry in springs from Taftan geothermal area SE Iran". Journal of Volcanology and Geothermal Research. 304: 49–61. Bibcode:2015JVGR..304...49S. doi:10.1016/j.jvolgeores.2015.07.023.
- Skrine, C. P. (October 1931). "The Highlands of Persian Baluchistan". The Geographical Journal. 78 (4): 321–338. Bibcode:1931GeogJ..78..321S. doi:10.2307/1784749. JSTOR 1784749.
