= Lithos (journal) =

- Discipline: Petrology
- Language: English

Publication details
- Publisher: Elsevier
- Open access: hybrid
- Impact factor: 3.913 (2018)

Standard abbreviations
- ISO 4: Lithos

Indexing
- ISSN: 0024-4937

Links
- Journal homepage

Lithos is a peer-reviewed academic journal, publishing original research papers on the petrology, geochemistry and petrogenesis of igneous and metamorphic rocks. Lithos is a hybrid open-access journal and publishes both subscription and open access articles.
