= Sar'akhor =

Volcano in Iran

Sar'akhor is a volcano in Iran.

The tectonic regimen in Iran is characterized by the past collision of Arabia with Asia and the still ongoing convergence, which is accommodated by strike-slip faulting and contraction in the Alborz Mountains and the Zagros Mountains. Sar'akhor lies in the Kopeh Dag region where Central Iran and Eurasia interact.

Sar'akhor is the largest volcano in the area, having a diameter of c. 30 kilometres (19 mi). It is formed by a foundation made of basaltic lava which occasionally contains olivine and an edifice proper constructed by andesite and dacite in the form of pyroclastics. It was active between the Miocene and Pliocene. With such an age, erosion has had a long time to degrade the edifice; presently it rises about 800 metres (2,600 ft) above the terrain, with the present-day edifice being the middle and lower part of the previous volcano. The old edifice was about 3,000 metres (9,800 ft) high, thus relatively large.

Sar'akhor belongs to a group of intraplate volcanoes such as Mount Etna in Italy and Ararat and Damavand in the Near East which appear to be more dependent on deep processes rather than crustal boundaries.

It is crossed by the Sar'akhor fault, which has partly offset the edifice and has had historical earthquakes.

== Sources ==
- Shabanian, Esmaeil; Acocella, Valerio; Gioncada, Anna; Ghasemi, Habibollah; Bellier, Olivier (2012-06-01). "Structural control on volcanism in intraplate post collisional settings: Late Cenozoic to Quaternary examples of Iran and Eastern Turkey". Tectonics. 31 (3): TC3013. Bibcode:2012Tecto..31.3013S. doi:10.1029/2011tc003042. ISSN 1944-9194.
