= Koh-i-Sultan =

Volcano in Pakistan

- Koh-e-Sultan, Kuh-i-Sultan, Kuh-e-Sultan
- Location within Pakistan Location within Balochistan, Pakistan

Highest point
- Elevation: 2,334 m (7,657 ft)
- Coordinates: 29°7′20″N 62°49′1″E

Naming
- English translation: Mountain of the King

Geography
- Location: Balochistan, Pakistan

Geology
- Rock age: Miocene-Late Pleistocene
- Mountain type: Stratovolcano
- Volcanic arc: Sultan/Makran/Baluchistan volcanic arc
- Last eruption: 90,000 ± 10,000 years ago

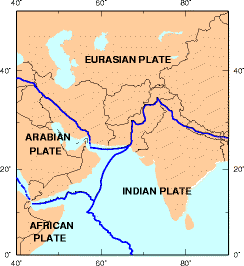
While most of Pakistan is located on the Indian Plate, Koh-i-Sultan is situated on the Eurasian Plate

Koh-i-Sultan (کوه سلطان) is a volcano in Balochistan, Pakistan. It is part of the tectonic belt formed by the collision of the Eurasian Plate and Arabian Plate: specifically, a segment influenced by the subduction of the Arabian plate beneath the Asian plate and forming a volcanic arc which includes the Bazman and Taftan volcanoes in Iran. The volcano consists of three main cones, with heavily eroded craters running west-northwest and surrounded by a number of subsidiary volcanic centres. Its summit is 2,334 metres (7,657 ft) high, and the crater associated with the Miri cone has a smaller crater inside.

The volcano is formed by andesite and dacite rocks, with fragmentary rocks prevailing over lava flows. The rocks have typical arc-volcano chemistry and composition, with a progression from andesite to dacite in the eruption products with younger age. Potassium-argon dating has indicated an age range from 5,900,000 to 90,000 years. Subsequent erosion has generated a large debris apron around the base of the volcano and carved rock formations which impressed early explorers; one well-known rock formation is the staff-like Neza e Sultan (trans. "Sultan's Spear").

Geothermal activity and the emission of volcanic gases are ongoing, and the volcano has been prospected for the possibility of obtaining geothermal energy. The geothermal activity has resulted in widespread rock alteration and the formation of sulfur deposits, which were mentioned in a 1909 report and later mined. Koh-i-Sultan also has deposits of other minerals.

== Geography and geology ==
=== Political geography and human history ===
Koh-i-Sultan is in the Chagai District of the Quetta Division, Baluchistan, Pakistan. A nearby settlement is Nokkundi with the Nokkundi railway station, 37 kilometres (23 mi) south. Henry Walter Bellew was the first to report the volcano's existence in 1862, and the Geological Survey of British India conducted mining and reconnaissance operations from 1941 to 1944. In 1961, a truck-accessible mining road was built from Nokkundi to the volcano's summit. Its name, translated as "Mountain of the King", is a reference to a saint in the local Baluchi religion with the name "Pir Sultan" (not necessarily the same individual as Pir Sultan), who was supposedly absorbed by the mountain at his death.

=== Regional ===
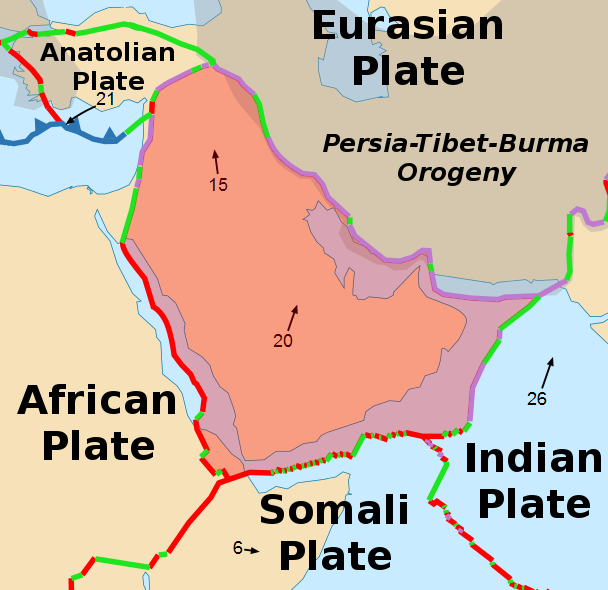
The formation of the Koh-i-Sultan volcano is related to the subduction of the Arabian Plate under the Eurasian Plate

Pakistan is part of the active tectonic belt which is responsible for the formation of the Himalayas following the collision of the Eurasian and Indian plates. As a result of this activity, hydrothermal alteration and hydrothermal activity are expected to be widespread in Pakistan. Koh-i-Sultan is the youngest volcano in Pakistan.

It is tectonically influenced by the Arabian Plate subducting beneath the Eurasian Plate, forming the Chagai volcanic zone. Tectonic activity related to this subduction is ongoing. Before the onset of volcanic activity at Koh-i-Sultan in the early Quaternary, tectonic uplift occurred in the region. Koh-i-Sultan and the Iranian volcanoes Bazman and Taftan form the Sultan volcanic arc. Also known as the Makran or Baluchistan volcanic arc, it is c. 500 kilometres (310 mi) long and stretches in an east-northeast direction. Magma generated by the relatively shallow subduction of the Indian Plate rises to the surface and forms the andesitic rocks, among others, of Taftan and Koh-i-Sultan. The related Makran subduction zone is one of the few Cretaceous zones still active, and has formed a large accretionary prism.

=== Local ===
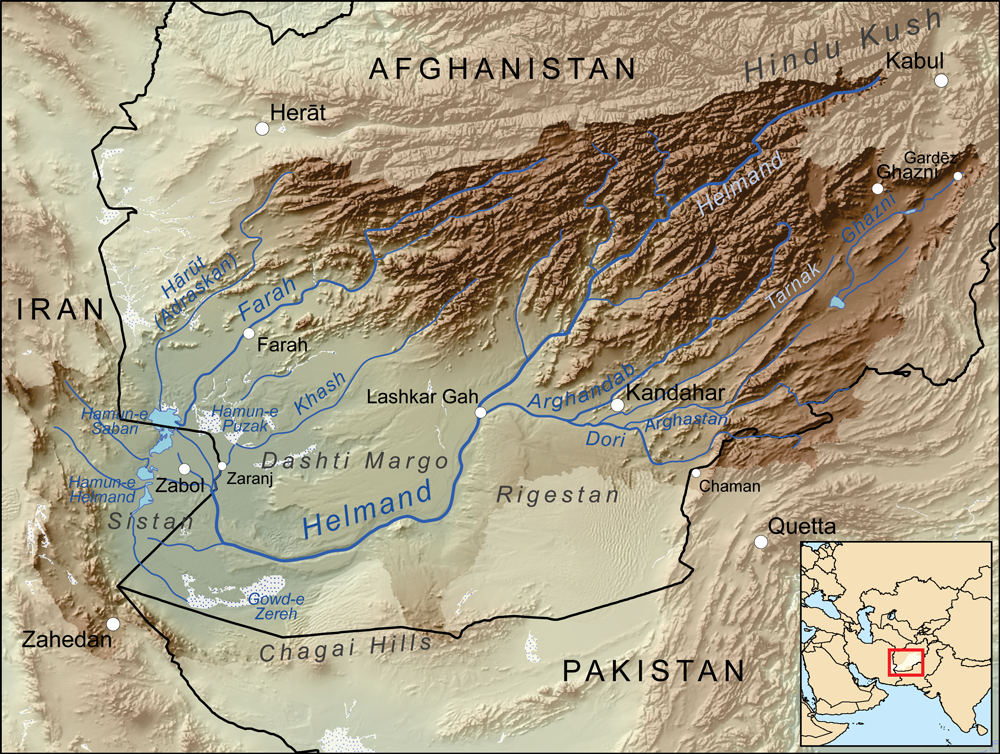
Koh-i-Sultan is the central mountain in the Chagai Hills

Koh-i-Sultan is a volcanic complex with at least three cones, named either Mian Koh, Gamichah and Miri, or Kansuri, Abu and Miri (after their respective summits). Each has a central crater—the largest of which is over 5 kilometres (3.1 mi) wide—which have been heavily affected by erosion. The summit of Koh-i-Sultan is 2,334 metres (7,656 ft) high and the 2,333-metre (7,654 ft)-high Miri is considered the youngest cone. Its crater is nested; the outer crater has a diameter of 6.5 kilometres (4.0 mi) and the inner crater, formed by resurgent activity, has a diameter of 800 metres (2,600 ft). Miri's summit, south of the crater, is surrounded by a zone of altered rock. Subsidiary volcanic centres also exist in the form of volcanic plugs and satellite cones; those around Miri are named Bag Koh, Batal Koh, Chhota Dalil, Dam Koh, Koh-e-Dalil, Koh-e-Malik and Mit Koh. The volcanic pile covers an area of 500 to 770 square kilometres (190 to 300 sq mi), and the volcanic complex has an area of 27 by 16 kilometres (17 mi × 10 mi) running west-northwest. Although Koh-i-Sultan is considered dormant or extinct, ongoing fumarolic activity has been recorded.

The volcano consists of agglomerates, flows and tuff. Lava flows make up about 10 percent of the volcanic pile, and the remainder is volcaniclastic material. Other layers alternate between ash, lava and pyroclastic flows. Andesitic-dacitic materials dominate, including block-and-ash flows, lahars and tuff. Andesitic lava flows have thicknesses of 1–2 metres (3 ft 3 in – 6 ft 7 in); two at Miri are 3 metres (9.8 ft) and 100 metres (330 ft) thick. The dacites form lava domes and subsidiary centres. Rock fragments are widely buried by long lava flows, and an Eocene mélange makes up part of the volcano's basement.

The rocks follow the calc-alkaline trend of magmatic differentiation, containing silicic lavas such as dacite. Their overall composition ranges from basaltic andesite to dacite, and the dominant lava rocks are andesite and basalt. Andesites range from green to gray in colour, and dacites are pink- and light-gray. The andesitic lavas contain phenocrysts of andesine, hornblende, plagioclase and hypersthene. Dacites have biotite, hornblende, plagioclase and quartz phenocrysts. Textures range from porphyritic to vitreophyritic. Andesites are more common in Pliocene rocks, and Pleistocene rocks tend to be dacitic. At least five cycles of andesite rock formation have been found on the southwest side of Koh-i-Sultan. Its rocks are typical volcanic-arc rocks in elemental chemistry, and may stem from sub-continental mantle-derived magma. The satellite centre rocks differ from the main centre rocks in composition, suggesting that different processes generated the magmas which constructed the cones. There is a compositional trend from Bazman over Taftan to Sultan, with the latter having more potassium in its rocks than the other centres. Such compositional trends may come from different partial melting ratios and different fluid contributions to magma generation at each volcano. Hydrothermal alteration has given rise to alunite, kaolinite, phengite, propylite and sericite.

Potassium-argon (K-Ar) dating of the Miri summit has yielded an age of 200,000 years, and an older date (5,900,000 ± 2,800,000) has been obtained from the northwestern centre. Between the two are andesite dates of 5,630,000 ± 90,000 years and 2,390,000 ± 50,000 years. Although the last activity occurred during the Pleistocene (probably a large eruption), volcanism began earlier. After a phase of erosion, an ash fall occurred. The youngest date, obtained from K-Ar dating of pumice, is 90,000 ± 10,000 years. Koh-i-Sultan's Pleistocene activity is probably related to the formation of travertine deposits, which are mined.

Although the volcano has experienced relatively little dissection, the western cone has been eroded to the base and there is widespread hydrothermal alteration of rocks. Post-volcanic erosion has created an apron of rock fragments at Koh-i-Sultan's base, with radially incised valleys bearing traces of energetic stream erosion emanating from the volcanic cones. Koh-i-Sultan's remaining rock formations often have irregular shapes with a striking appearance; a 1909 report noted the presence of a monolith-shaped rock 91 metres (300 ft) and a dome-shaped rock formation, Koh-i-Kansuri. Neza e Sultan ("Sultan's Spear") is a major spear-shaped rock formation, about 300 metres (1,000 ft) high with a basal diameter of 91 metres (300 ft). Weathering has created longitudinal fissures in the rock. Similar pillars are found elsewhere on the volcano, reminding early explorers of Gothic architecture and minarets. Neza e Sultan (possibly named after the mythical Sultan-i-Pir-Khaisar, who is reportedly buried nearby), at the westernmost crater, was discovered by Europeans in 1877. The rock formations may be necks of old volcanic centres. Gravel, pebbles and sand form playas and dunes, also found in dry valleys.

Previous volcanic activity in the area includes the Cretaceous Sinjrani volcanics, resembling those of Koh-i-Sultan, and activity which produced the Chagai monzonites. The Sinjrani volcanics, about 1,000 metres (3,300 ft) thick, consist primarily of lava. Other rocks are agglomerates, limestone and tuff, and the Cretaceous rocks are mainly andesitic. The monzonitic Chagai intrusions are accompanied by other intrusions with additional minerals. Other formations are the mostly sedimentary Humai formation of the late Cretaceous and the probably Paleocene Jazzak formation. The Chagai topography is dominated by a sand-covered plain, rising to an altitude of 750–900 metres (2,460–2,950 ft). Wind-eroded rocks and dry lake beds are also present. Other tectonic objects are the Ras Koh range, the Mirjawa range and the Chagai Hills east of Koh-i-Sultan. The Sinjrani and Chagai volcanics crop out primarily west of Koh-i-Sultan, and are part of the older Chagai volcanic arc. Some geologists consider Koh-i-Sultan part of the Chagai arc. Two nearby volcanic centres are Damodin and Koh-i-Dalel, which may be part of Koh-i-Sultan together with Koh and Koh-i-Malik-Shah. Koh i-Kannesin is northeast of Koh-i-Sultan. The crust beneath the volcano reaches a thickness of about 60 kilometres (37 mi).

== Environment ==
There is little precipitation in Chagai, about 160 millimetres per year (6.3 in/year). Koh-i-Sultan drains into two salt pans, and is responsible for a rain shadow effect on the Sistan Basin farther north. The environment around the volcano is arid, with little vegetation; according to an 1895–1896 report, however, asafoetida was collected nearby. There is a large difference in temperature between summer and winter.

== Geothermal field ==
Hot springs exist around Koh-i-Sultan, with the Talu spring the best known. Other springs (Batal Kaur, Miri Kaur and Padagi Kaur) are in riverbeds near the Miri crater. Temperatures of 25–36 °C (77–97 °F) have been measured in water samples, but the three springs have temperatures lower than the ambient temperature: 25.6–34.8 °C (78.1–94.6 °F). The hydrothermal activity suggests a magma chamber beneath the volcano. Water is probably stored in fractures within the Sinjrani volcanics, and is heated by a reservoir with a temperature of 200–300 °C (392–572 °F) or 112–207 °C (234–405 °F). At least one spring is associated with a fault. Isotope data and composition indicate that the hot-spring water is precipitation-related; its composition is modified by interaction with hot rocks, with the water following a path beginning northeast of Miri crater. Country-rock salts, probably dissolved by sulfuric acid, are found in the waters. The springs' sulfur is of magmatic origin. Hydrothermal activity has modified the rocks around Koh-i-Sultan, with Miri Kaur featuring silicified rocks and the area southwest of Miri featuring acidic alteration. Some springs in the area have a very low pH. The region is the least developed in Pakistan, and Koh-i-Sultan may be a usable source of geothermal energy; however, the lack of rainfall may make it hydrologically unsuitable for energy generation.

Emanations of hydrogen sulfide have been reported around the volcano, preventing the mining of underground sulfur deposits, and the gas is also present in the hot springs. The confirmed presence of sulfur dioxide would indicate hot magma beneath the volcano.

== Mining and mineral deposits ==
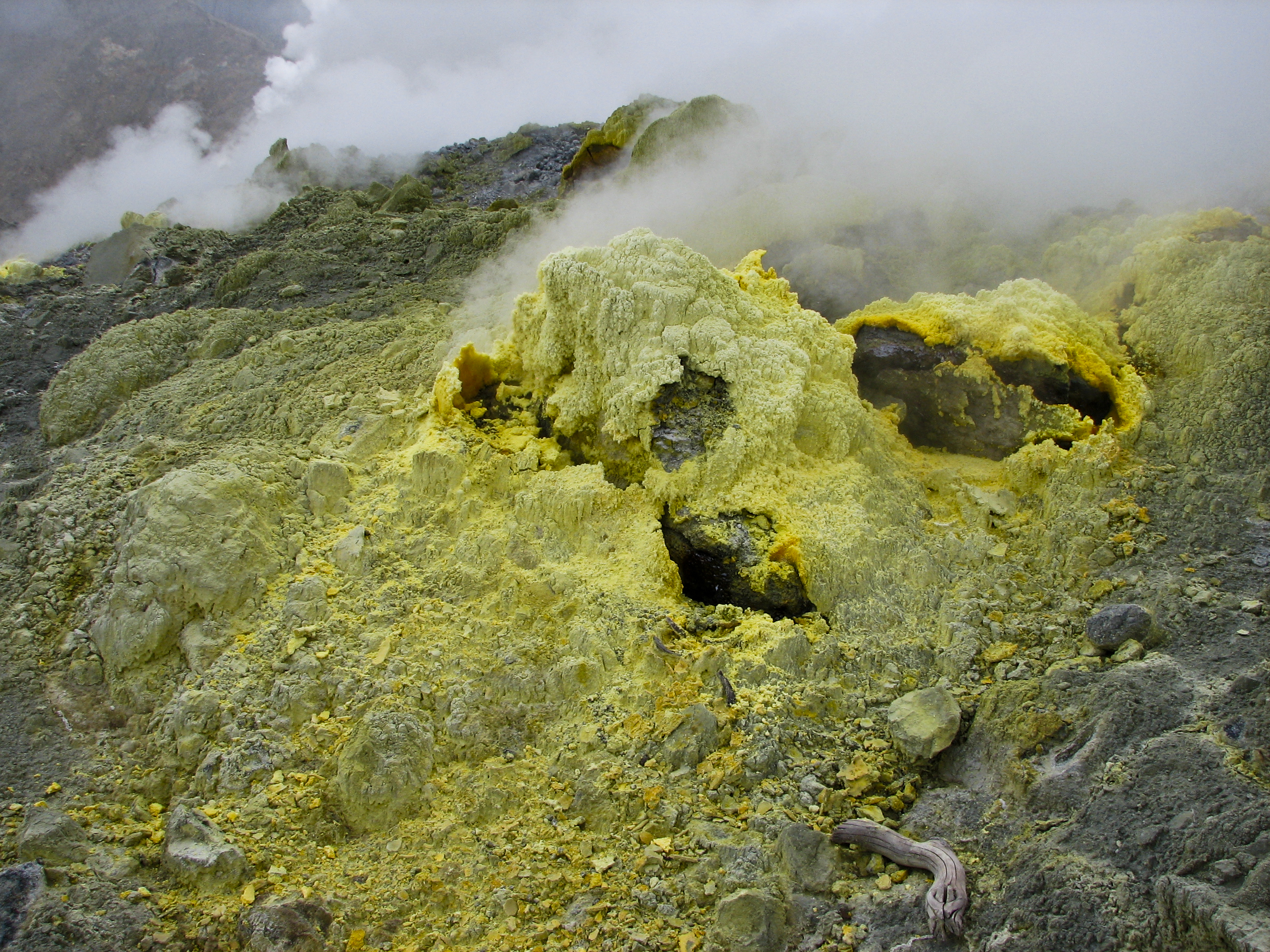
Sulfur, a common mineral associated with volcanic activity, is the most important mineral found at Koh-i-Sultan

A number of minerals are found at Koh-i-Sultan; sulfur is the most important but copper, gold and molybdenum have also been discussed. Reserves were estimated in 1976 at 85,000 tonnes (84,000 long tons; 94,000 short tons) of sulfur ore, 47,000 tonnes (46,000 long tons; 52,000 short tons) of which were high-grade and 38,000 tonnes (37,000 long tons; 42,000 short tons) low-grade ore. Sulfur is found on Sultan's southern flank, where it originated from solfatara activity. According to a 1975 report, about 20 tonnes per day (0.23 long ton/ks) of 50-percent-sulfur ore were mined; the report indicated that between 1941 and 1944, 66,700 tonnes (65,600 long tons; 73,500 short tons) of ore were produced. The recovery of sulfur, asafoetida and dyes at Koh-i-Sultan was claimed in a 1909 report.

The sulfur deposits, south of Koh-i-Sultan's crater, are named Batar, Miri, Nawar and Zond and are within a 18-square-kilometre (7 sq mi) area. In the deposits, the sulfur is in the form of lenses within the volcanic rock. The Koh-i-Sultan deposits are the principal native source of sulfur in Pakistan. They were probably formed by the interaction of sulfuric acid and hydrogen sulfide or from sulfur-containing hot springs when the volcano was still active. Another theory suggests that they formed during the Holocene. Other mineral deposits found at Koh-i-Sultan are copper-containing alterations with alunite and quartz; alunogen, which can be used to obtain aluminium; limonite, used as a yellow dye, and a red ochre rock containing gypsum and anthophyllite. Copper deposits which also contain gold are part of an epithermal-sulfidic mineralization at Washaab.

== See also ==
- List of mountains in Pakistan, Iran
- Taftan Volcano, at the Iranian side of the border
