= Chalus =

Chalus can refer to:

== Places ==
- Châlus, a commune in the Haute-Vienne département of France
- Chalus, Puy-de-Dôme, a commune in the Puy-de-Dôme département of France
- Chalus, Iran, a city in Mazandaran province of Iran
- Chalus County, an administrative subdivision of Mazandaran Province of Iran
- Chalus Road, in Iran
- Chalus River, in Iran

== People ==
- Chalus (surname)

== See also ==
- Calus (disambiguation)
- Callus (disambiguation)
