= Calus =

Calus may refer to:

- Căluș, a traditional Romanian dance
- Čālūs, a city in Mazandaran, Iran
- Čālūs River, a river in Mazandaran, Iran
- An enemy boss in the Destiny 2 campaign

== See also ==
- Callus (disambiguation)
- Chalus (disambiguation)
