= Thick skin =

Thick skin can refer to:

- The ability to withstand criticism.
- Literally thick skin covering the body of an animal, such as an elephant or rhinoceros.
- Callus, an area of thickened skin
  - Callus (disambiguation), similar uses of Callus such as a lack of empathy (callousness).
- Thick Skinned, a 1989 French film
- "Thick Skin", a song by Leona Lewis from I Am
- "Thick Skin", a 2025 song by Baker Boy from Djandjay
- Thick Skin, a 2018 album by Tia Gostelow

== See also ==
- Pachyderm (disambiguation)
