= Do Khaharan =

Do Khaharan (Persian: دُو خواهران) may refer to the following articles:

- Alborz
- Do Khvaharan
