= Chalus (surname) =

Chalus or Chaluš is a surname, and may refer to:

- Ary Chalus (born 1961), French politician from Guadeloupe
- Françoise de Chalus (1734–1821), French royal mistress
- Matěj Chaluš (born 1998), Czech footballer

== See also ==
- Callus (surname)
