= Callus (disambiguation) =

Callus is an area of toughened skin.

Callus may also refer to:

- Fibrocartilage callus, the temporary new bony tissue that forms at the ends of a fractured bone
- Callus (botany), a fleshy lump of tissue on the labellum (or lip) of orchid flowers
- Callus (cell biology), a mass of unorganized cells
- Callus (mollusc), a thickened layer of shell material
- Callus (album), a 2016 album by Gonjasufi

== See also ==
- Calus (disambiguation)
- Callús, a municipality in Catalonia, Spain
- Thick skin (disambiguation)
- Callous, a trait where a person lacks empathy, or at least ignores it; hardhearted
