= Pachyderm =

Pachyderm may refer to:

- Pachydermata, an obsolete order of mammals
- Pachyderm Studios, an American recording studio
- Pachyderma, a skin condition

== See also ==
- Pachyderme, a 2022 French animated short film
- Pachydermia (gastropod), a genus of gastropods
