= Callus (surname) =

Callus is a surname. Notable people with the surname include:

- Ashley Callus (born 1979), Australian sprint freestyle swimmer
- Daniel Callus (1888–1965), Maltese historian and philosopher
- Helen Callus, British violist
- Ryan Callus (born 1983), Maltese politician
- Sharon Callus (born 1956), Maltese lawn bowler
