= Karaj River =

River in Iran

Coordinates: 34°46′50″N 51°49′51″E

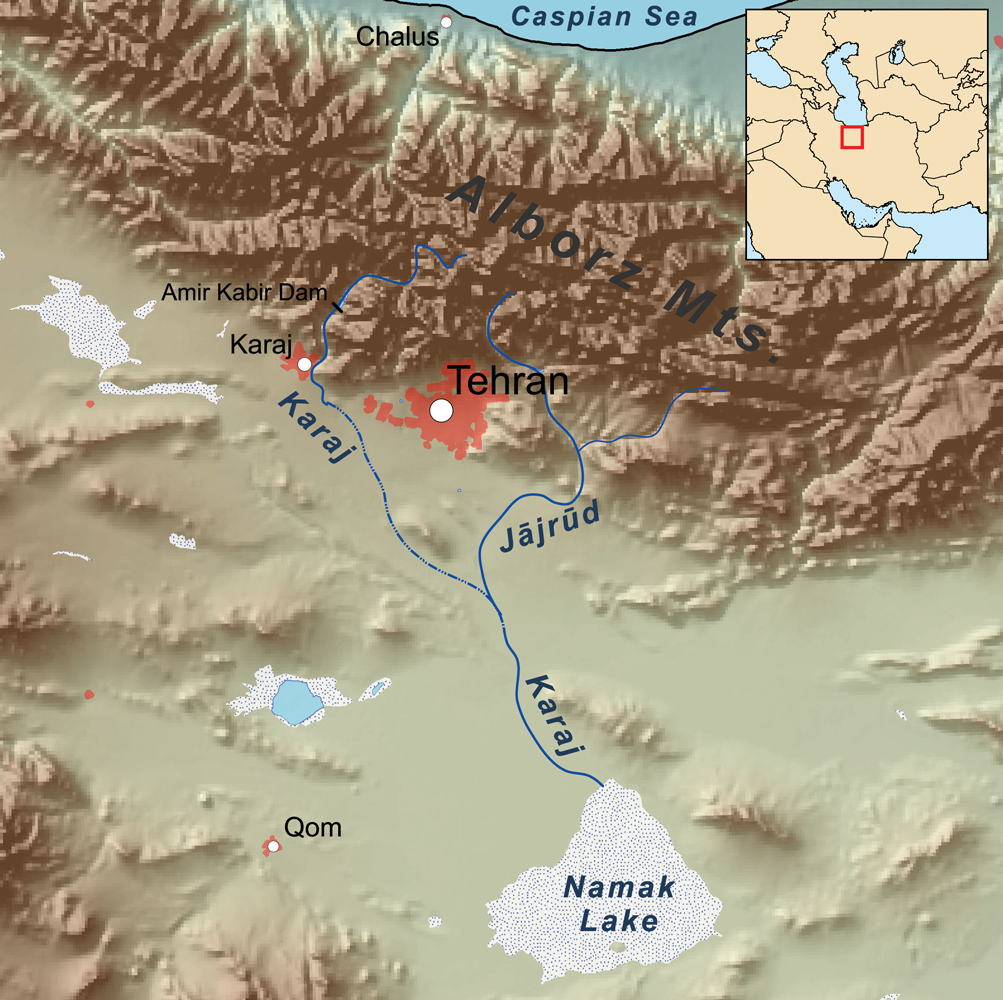

Karaj River (Persian: رودخانه کرج) is located in the central plateau of Iran. It is the second largest river after Zayandarud in the central plateau region.

== About ==
The Karaj runs roughly 152 miles (245 km) in length. Its headwaters are in the Central Alborz mountain range, north of Tehran in Alborz Province. It flows south past the city of Karaj, and then flows eastward with its tributary Jajrud joining in Tehran Province, to flow into the endorheic Namak Lake basin in the Qom Province.

The Amir Kabir Dam is constructed across the river in the foothills of the Alborz mountain range.

== Gallery ==
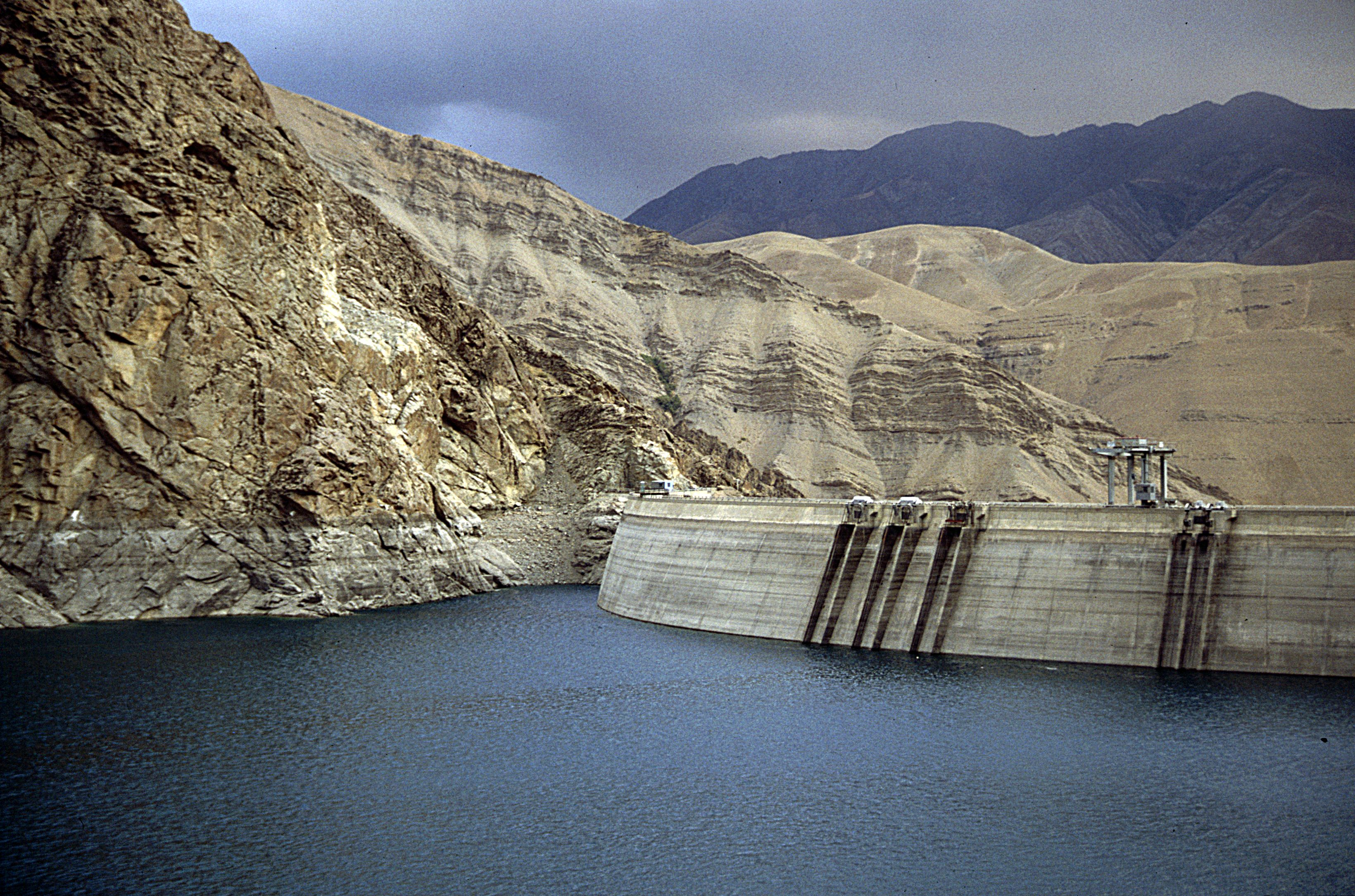
Karaj dam or Amir Kabir dam

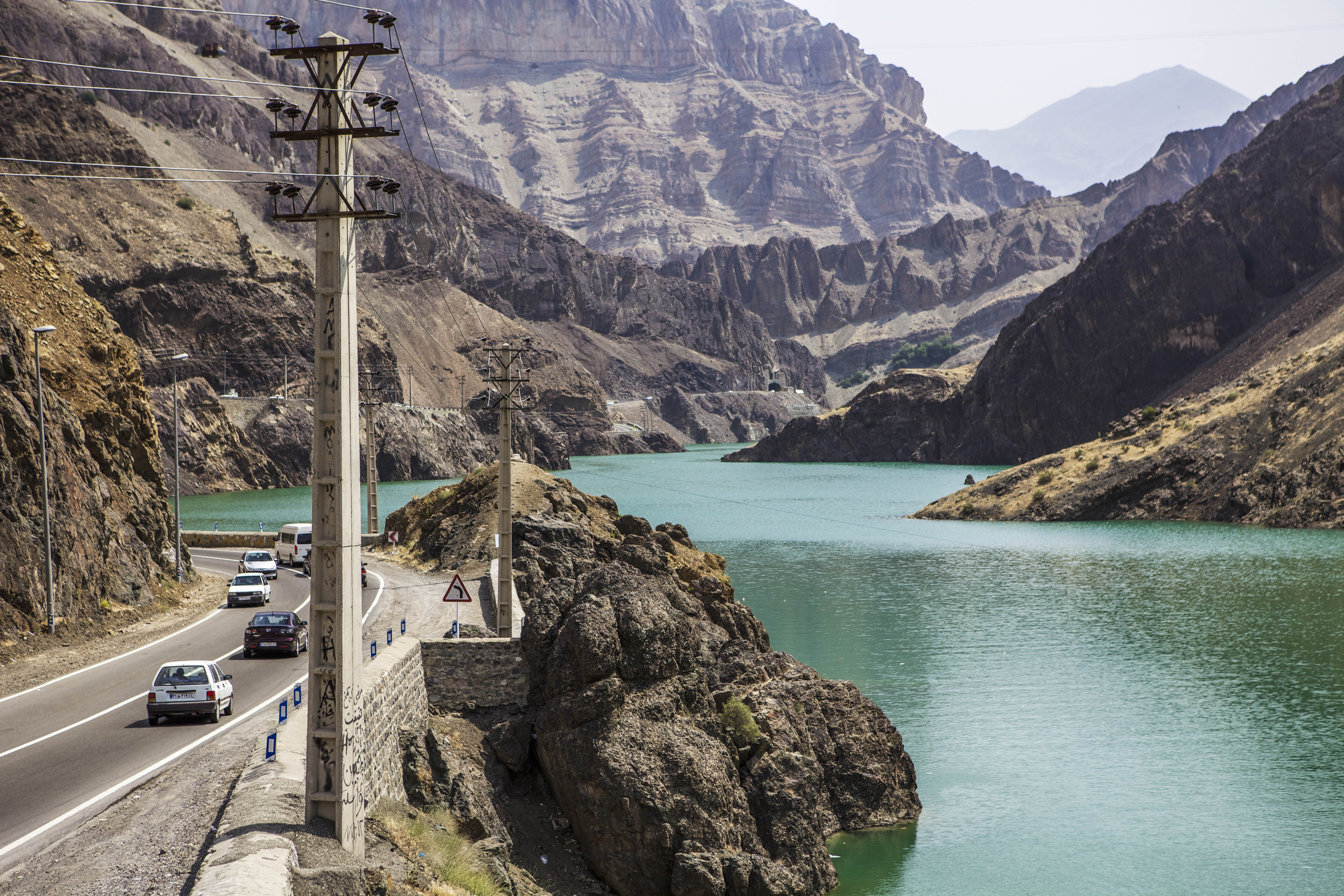
Amir kabir (Karaj) Dam over Karaj River

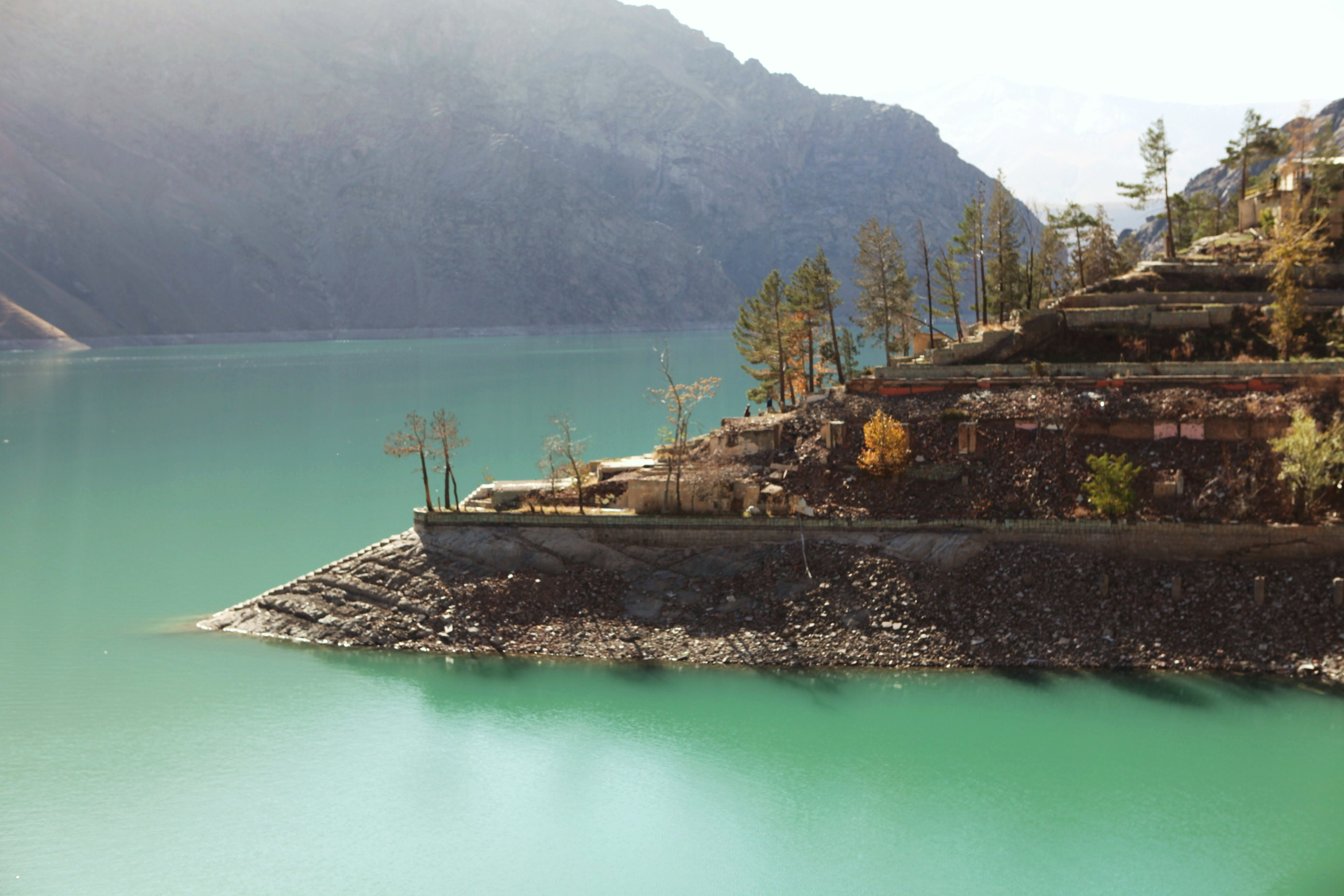
Amir Kabir Dam

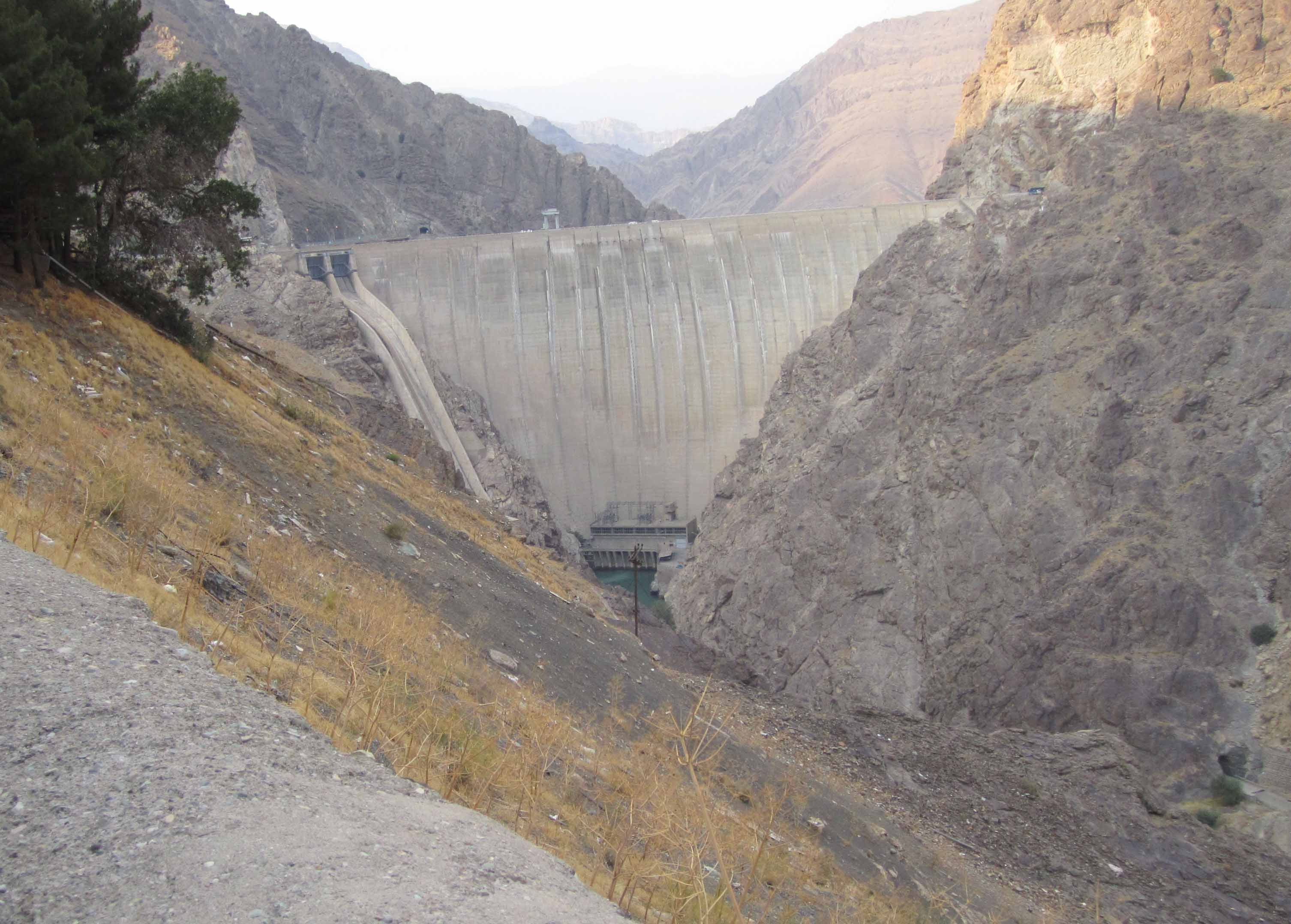
Amir Kabir Dam

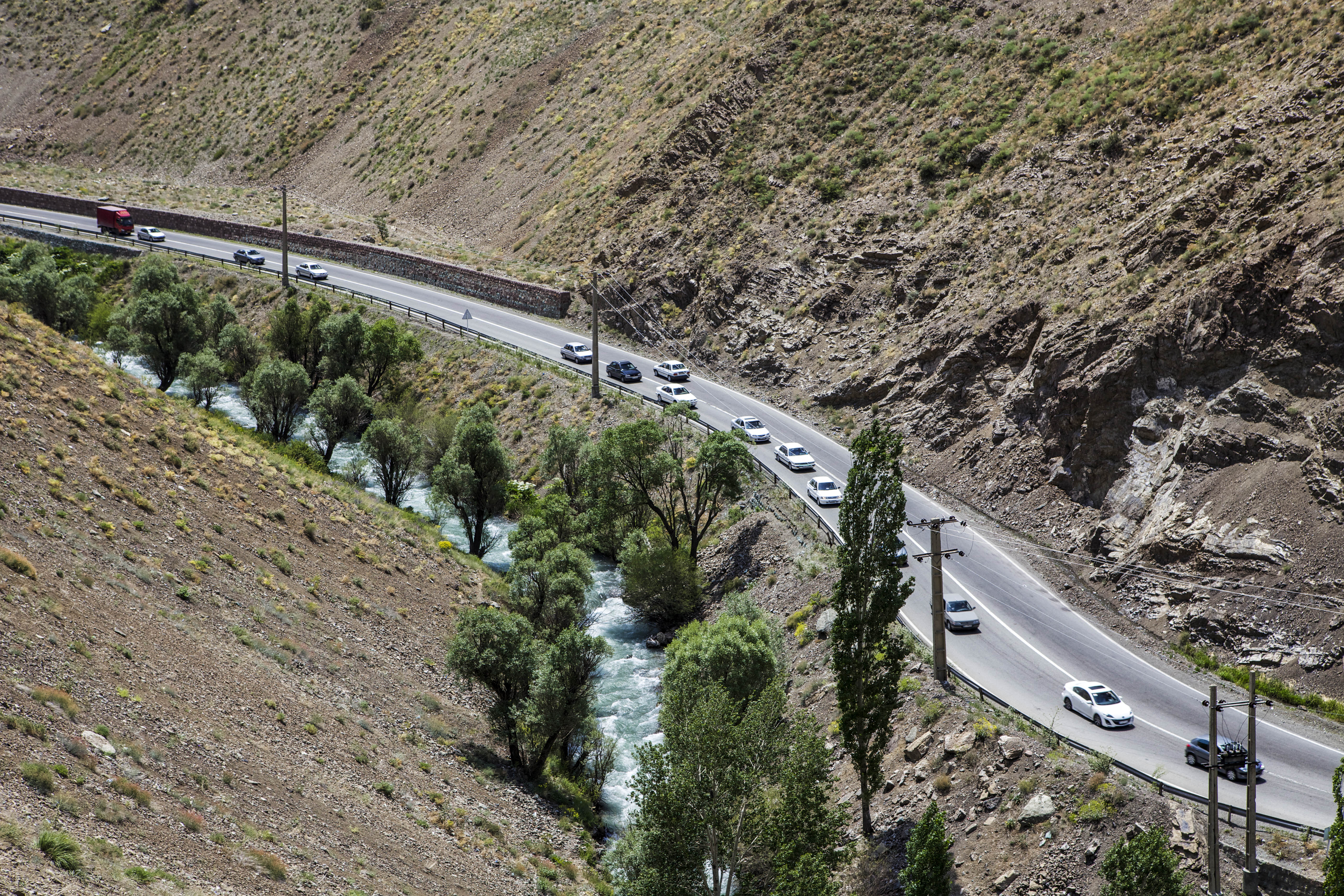
Chalus road - Ninara

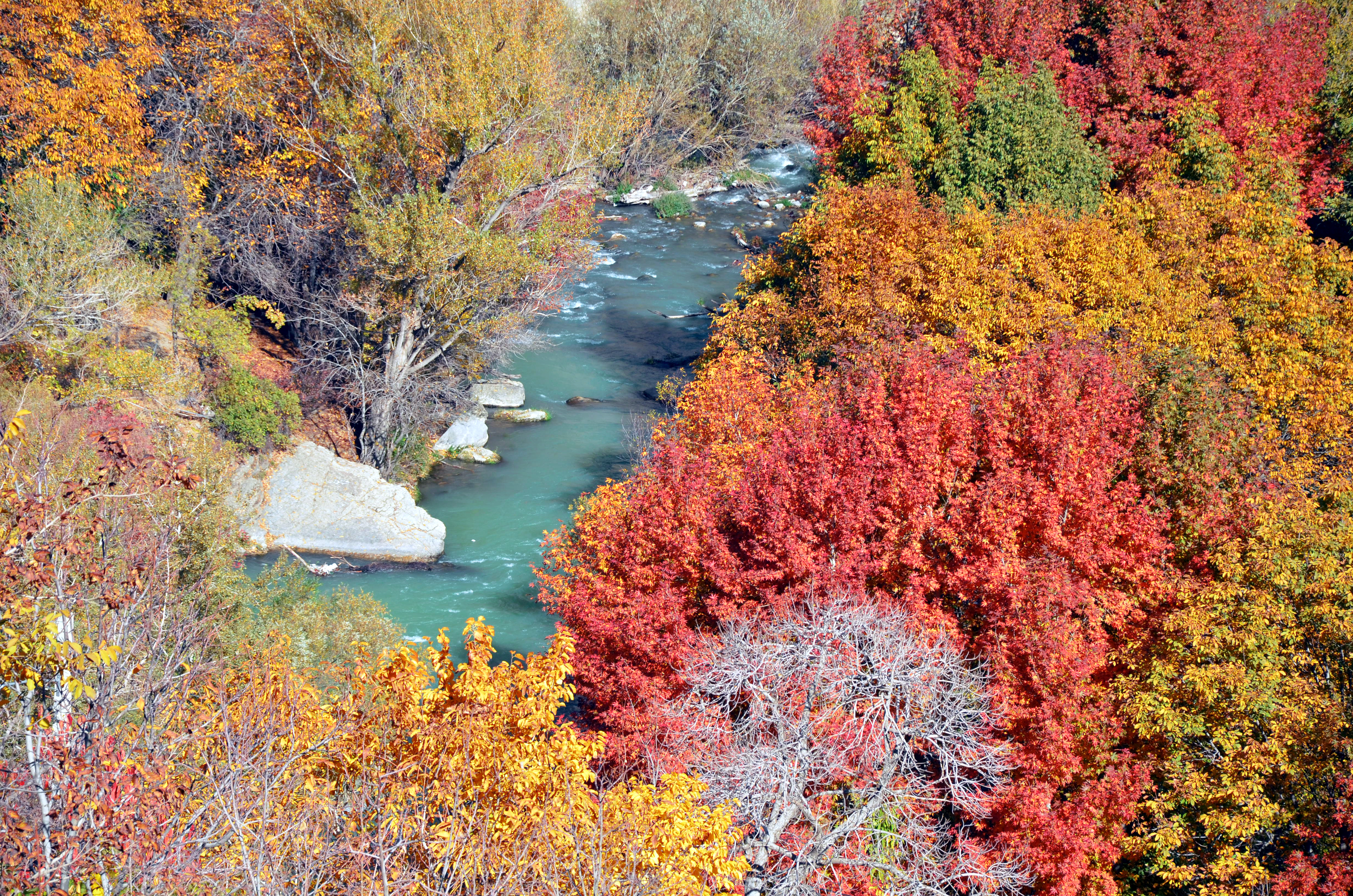
Karaj River in Adaran

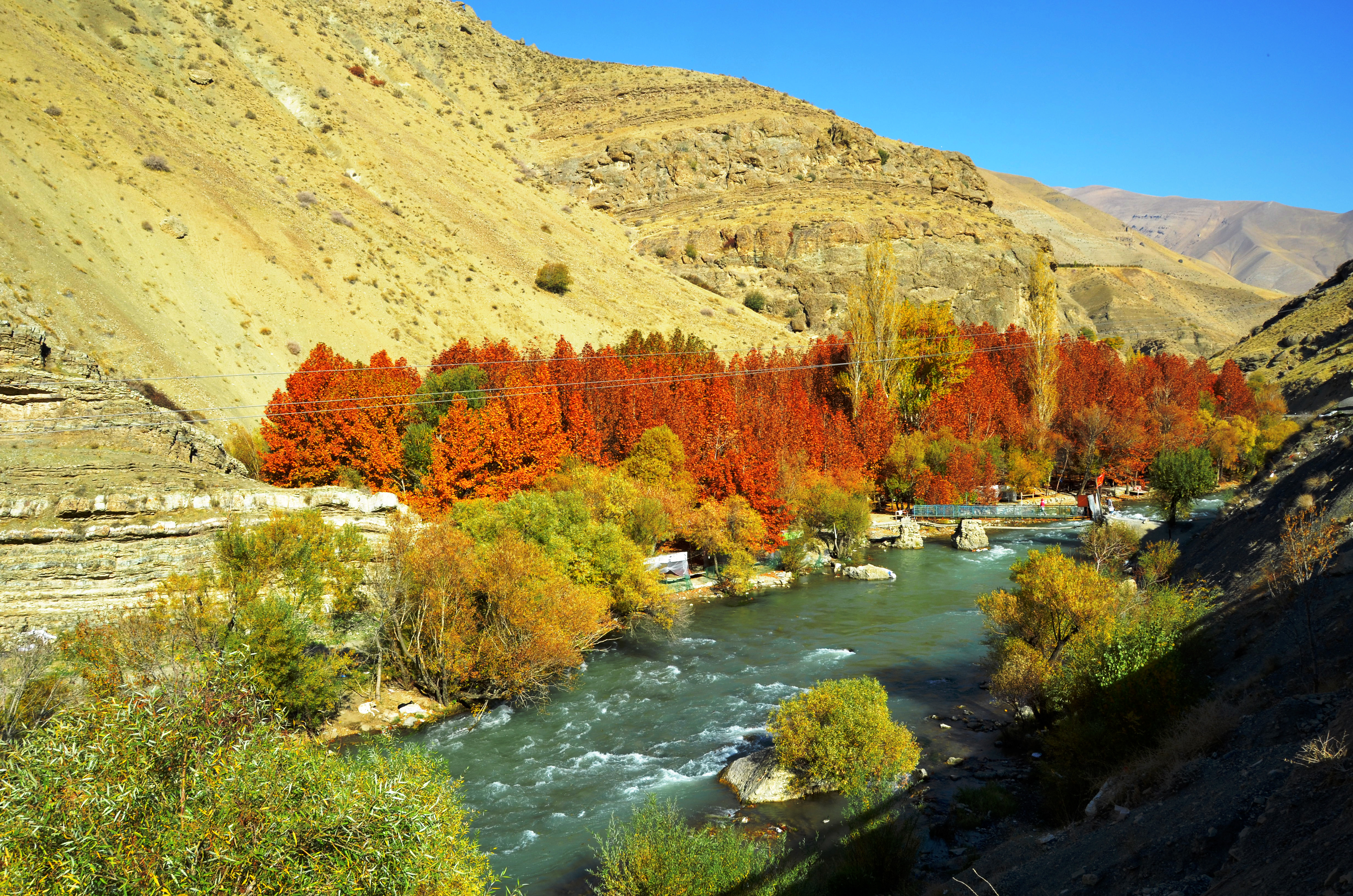
Karaj River

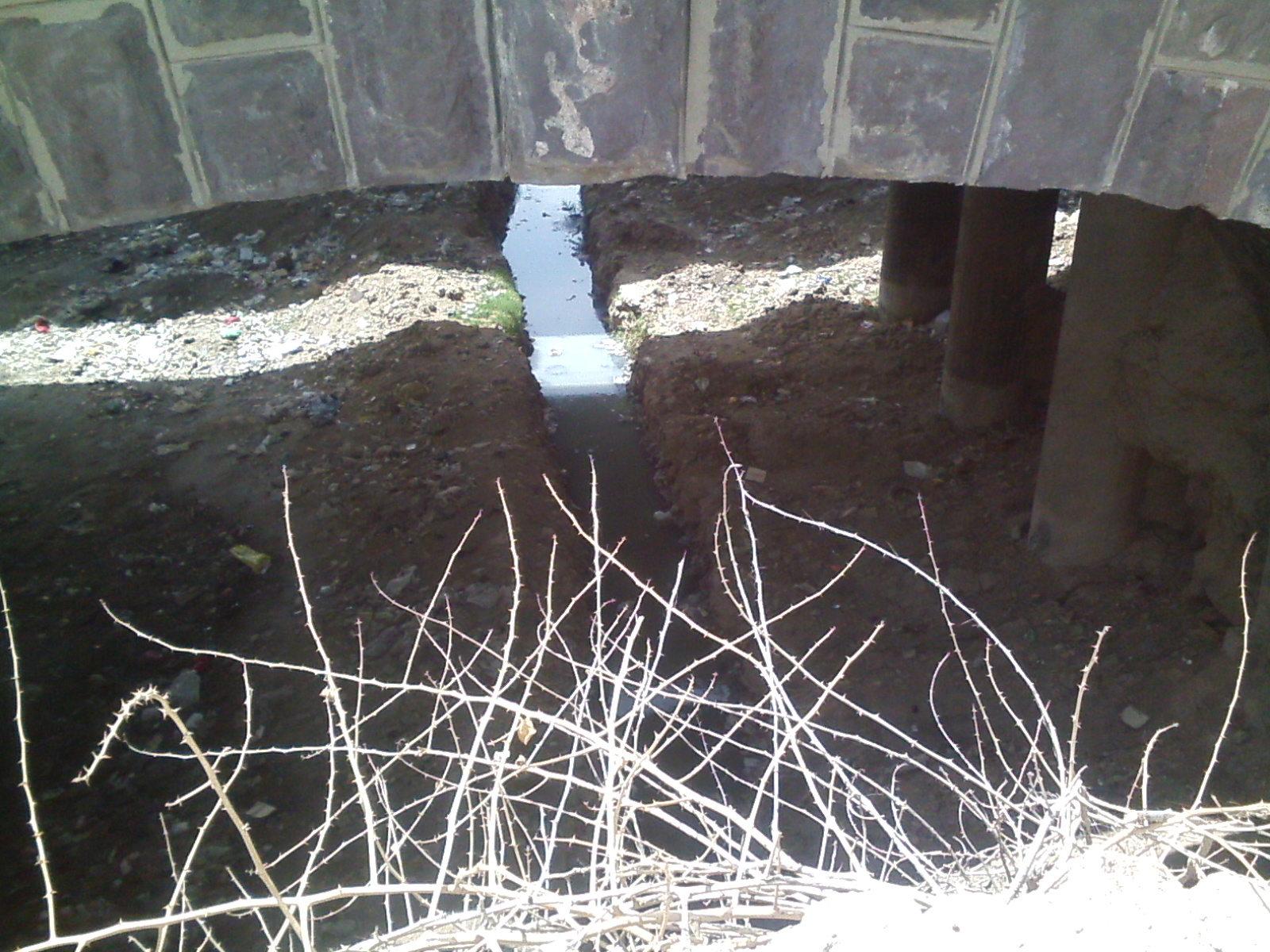
Narrow Karaj River channel under bridge

== See also ==
- Karaj B1 bridge
