= Varesabad =

Village in Ardabil province, Iran

Varesabad Persian: وارث‌آباد
- Village
- Location within Iran
- Coordinates: 37°30′08″N 48°24′12″E
- Country: Iran
- Province: Ardabil
- County: Khalkhal
- District: Central
- Rural District: Khanandabil-e Gharbi

Population (2016)
  - Total: 59
- Time zone: UTC+3:30 (IRST)

Varesabad (Persian: وارث‌آباد) (Note: Also romanized as Vāres̄ābād; also known as Varavasht) is a village in Khanandabil-e Gharbi Rural District of the Central District in Khalkhal County, Ardabil province, Iran.

== Demographics ==
=== Population ===
At the time of the 2006 National Census, the village's population was 49 in 10 households. The following census in 2011 counted 91 people in 27 households. The 2016 census measured the population of the village as 59 people in 16 households.
