= Do Khvaharan =

Do Khvaharan دوخواهران
- Village
- Location within Iran
- Coordinates: 33°38′38″N 49°01′20″E
- Country: Iran
- Province: Lorestan
- County: Dorud
- Bakhsh: Silakhor
- Rural District: Silakhor

Population (2006)
  - Total: 30
- Time zone: UTC+3:30 (IRST)
  - Summer (DST): UTC+4:30 (IRDT)

Do Khvaharan (Persian: دوخواهران, also Romanized as Do Khvāharān; also known as Do Khāharān) is a village in Silakhor Rural District, Silakhor District, Dorud County, Lorestan Province, Iran. At the 2006 census, its population was 30, in 7 families.
