= Alborz =

Mountain range in northern Iran

Alborz Mountains
- البرز (Persian)
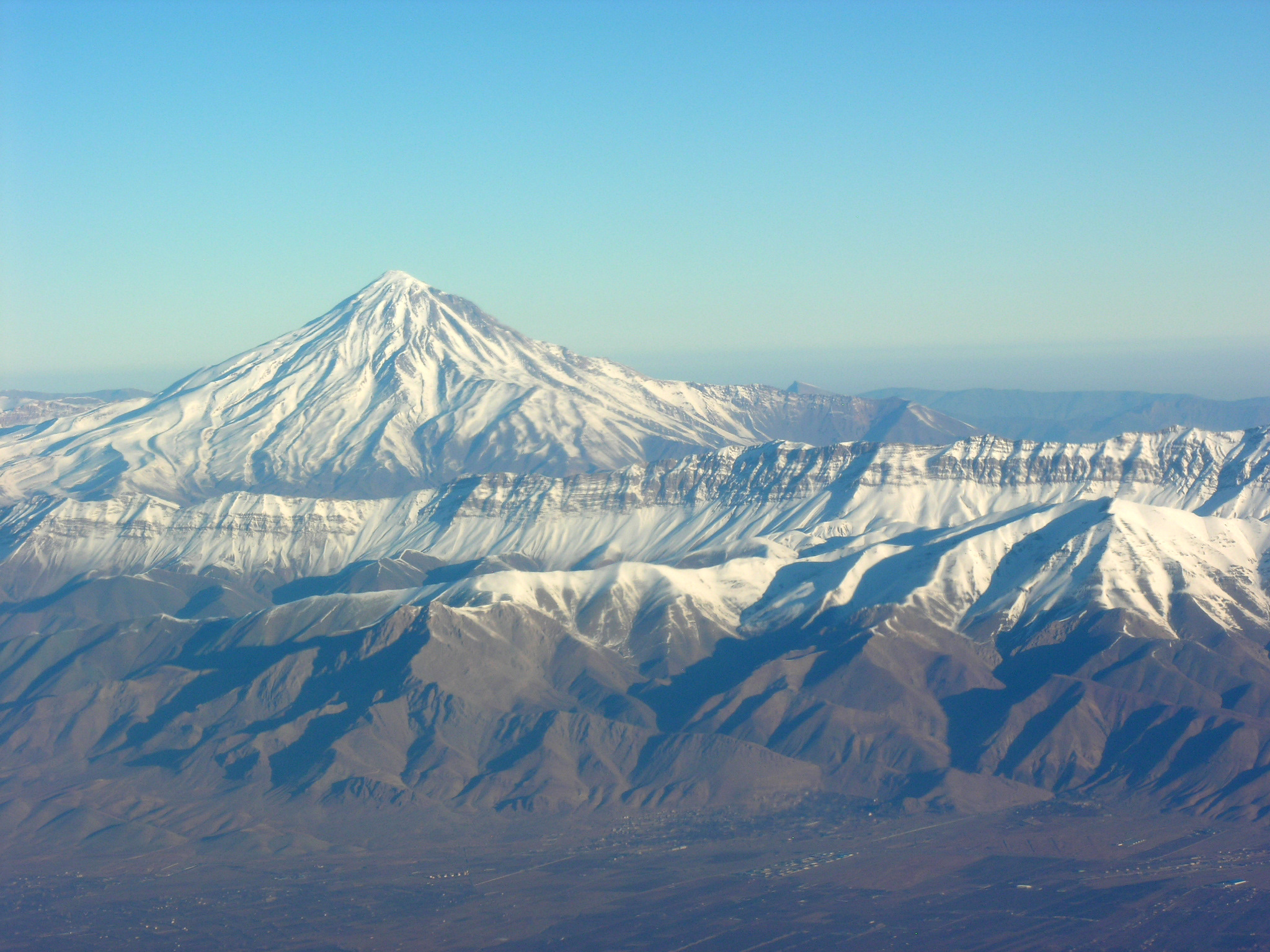
- Mount Damavand, Iran's highest mountain

Highest point
- Coordinates: 35°57′20″N 52°06′36″E

Geography
- Location within Iran

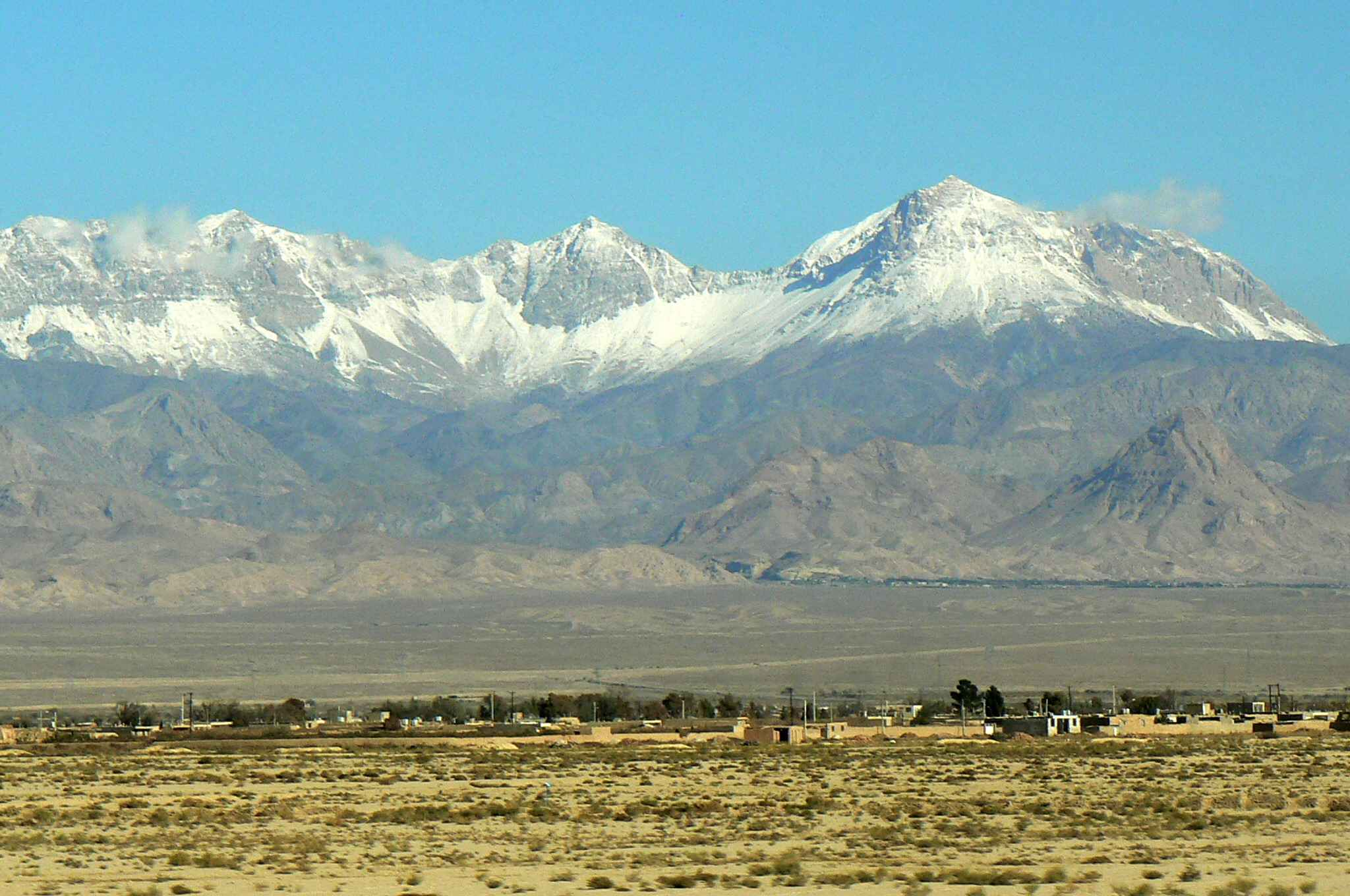
Alborz Mountains in Semnan Province. A combination of snow and desert.

The Alborz (Persian: البرز, pronounced [ʔælˈboɹz]; also spelt Alburz, Elburz or Elborz) is a mountain range in northern Iran that stretches from the border of Azerbaijan along the western and entire southern coast of the Caspian Sea and finally runs northeast and merges into the smaller Aladagh Mountains and borders in the northeast on the parallel mountain ridge Kopet Dag in the northern parts of Khorasan. All these mountains are part of the much larger Alpide belt. The Alborz range is divided into the Western, Central, and Eastern Alborz Mountains. The Western Alborz Range (usually called the Talysh) runs south-southeastward almost along the western coast of the Caspian Sea. The Central Alborz (the Alborz Mountains in the strictest sense) runs from west to east along the entire southern coast of the Caspian Sea. In contrast, the Eastern Alborz Range runs in a northeasterly direction, toward the northern parts of the Khorasan region, southeast of the Caspian Sea. Mount Damavand, the highest mountain in Iran, measuring 5,610.0 m (18,405.5 ft), is located in the Central Alborz Mountains. Mount Damavand is the 12th most prominent peak in the world and the second most prominent in Asia after Mount Everest.

Alborz on a geographic map of Iran

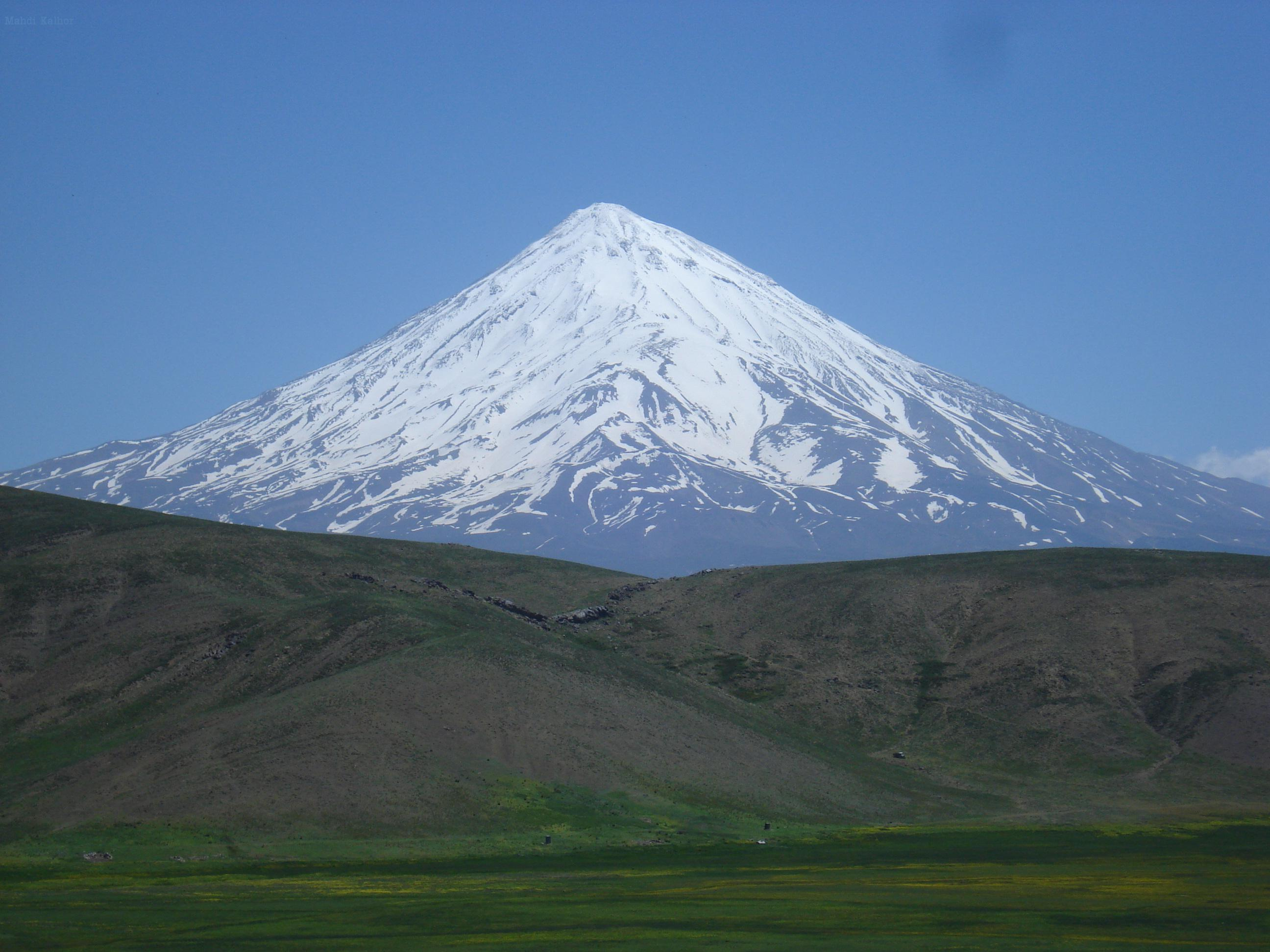
Damavand, the highest summit of Alborz

== Etymology ==
The name Alborz is derived from Harā Barazaitī, a legendary mountain in the Avesta, the main text of Zoroastrianism. Harā Barazaitī is from a Proto-Iranian name, Harā Bṛzatī, meaning "Mountain Rampart". Bṛzatī is the feminine form of the adjective bṛzant- "high", the ancestor of modern Persian bouland and BarzBerazandeh, cognate with Sanskrit Brihat. Harā may be interpreted as "watch" or "guard", from an Indo-European root *ser- "protect". In Middle Persian, Harā Barazaitī became Harborz, Modern Persian Alborz, which is a cognate with Elbrus, the highest peak of the Caucasus.

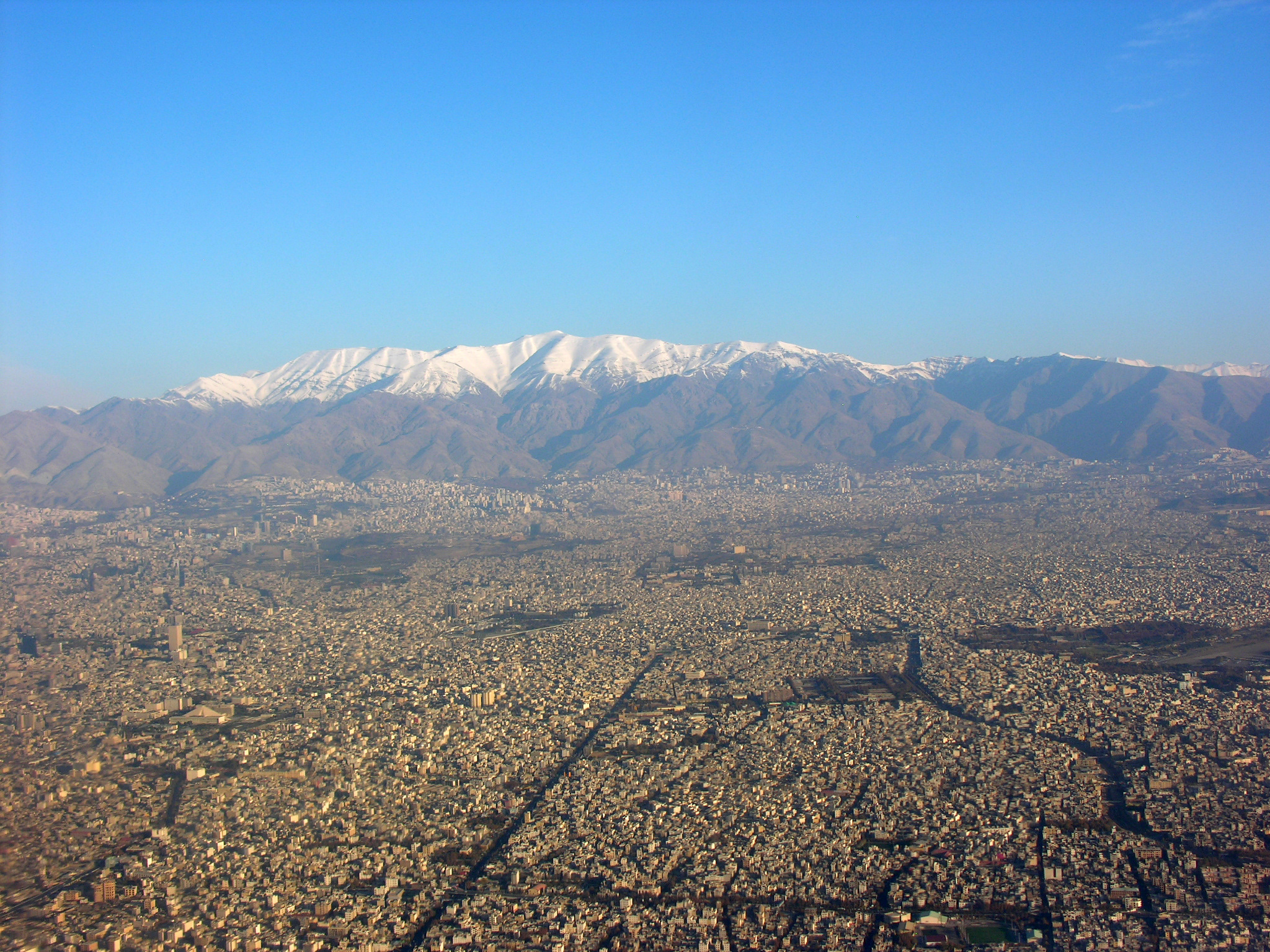
Alborz Mountain range seen from Tehran in 2008

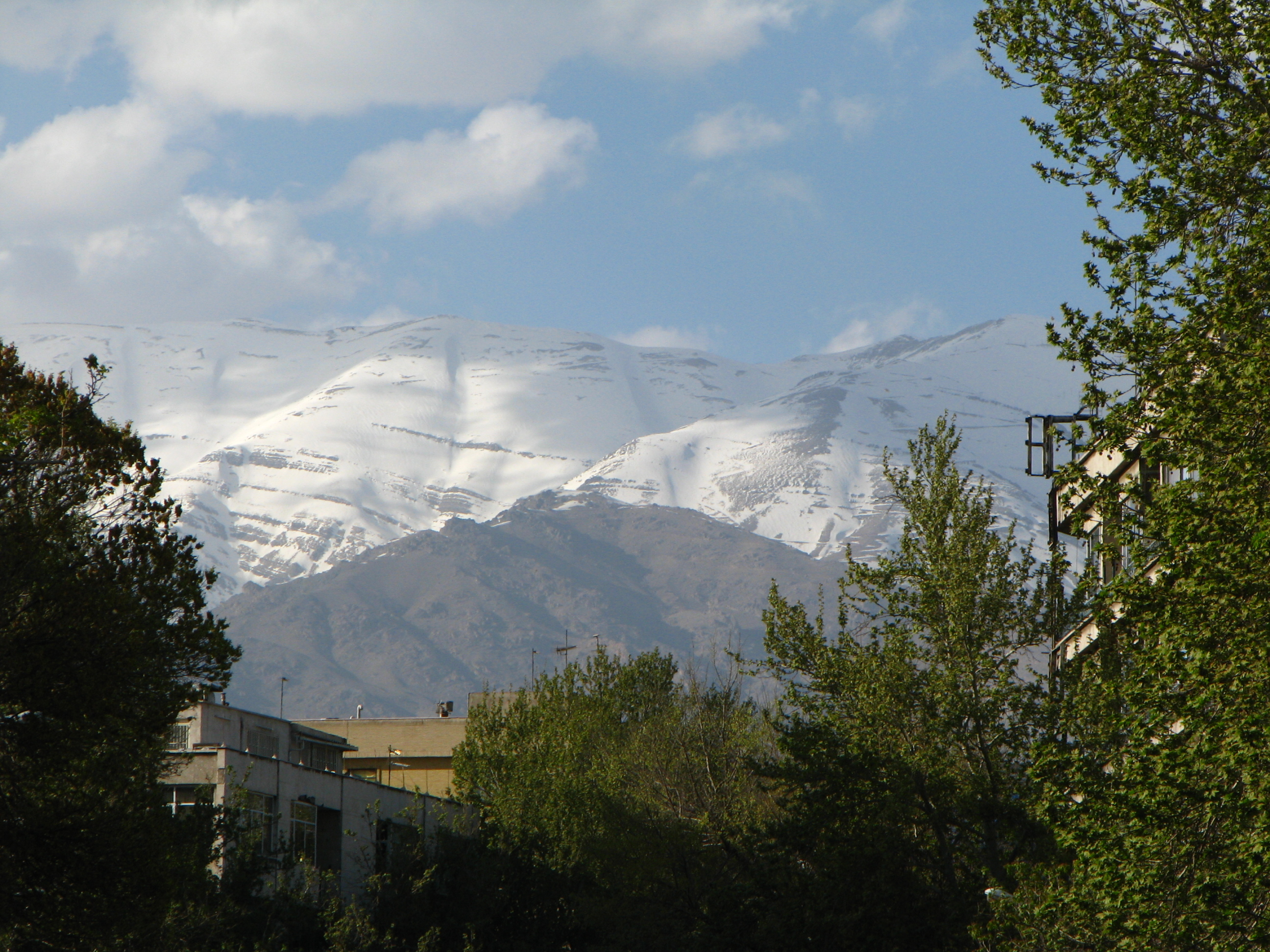
view of Alborz mountain seen from Tehran streets

== Mythology ==
Zoroastrians seem to identify the range with the dwelling place of the Peshyotan, and the Zoroastrian Ilm-e-Kshnoom sect identifies Mount Damavand as the home of the Saheb-e-Dilan ('Masters of the Heart'). In his epic Shahnameh, the poet Ferdowsi speaks of the mountains "as though they lay in India." This could reflect older usage, for numerous high peaks were given the name, and some even reflect it to this day, including Mount Elbrus in the Caucasus Mountains and Mount Elbariz (Albariz, Jebal Barez) in the Kerman area above the Strait of Hormuz. All these names reflect the same Iranian language compound, and have been speculatively identified, at one time or another, as the legendary mountain Hara Berezaiti of the Avesta.

== Geology ==
The Alborz mountain range forms a barrier between the south Caspian and the Iranian plateau. It is only 60–130 km wide and consists of sedimentary series dating from Upper Devonian to Oligocene, prevalently Jurassic limestone over a granite core. Continental conditions regarding sedimentation are reflected by thick Devonian sandstones and by Jurassic shales containing coal seams. Marine conditions are reflected by Carboniferous and Permian strata that are composed mainly of limestones. In the Eastern Alborz Range, the far eastern section is formed by Mesozoic (chiefly Triassic and Jurassic) rocks, while the western part of the Eastern Alborz Range is made primarily of Paleozoic rocks. Precambrian rocks can be found chiefly south of the city of Gorgan situated in the southeast of the Caspian Sea and, in much smaller amounts, in the central and western parts of the Central Alborz Range.

The central part of the Central Alborz Range is formed mainly of Triassic and Jurassic rocks, while the northwestern section of the range is mainly composed of Jurassic rocks. Very thick beds of Tertiary (mostly Eocene) green volcanic tuffs and lavas are found mainly in the southwestern and south-central parts of the range. The far northwestern part of the Alborz, that constitutes the Western Alborz Range or the Talish Mountains, is mainly made up of Upper Cretaceous volcano-sedimentary deposits, with a strip of Paleozoic rocks and a band of Triassic and Jurassic rocks in the southern parts, both in a northwest–southeast direction. As the Tethys Sea was closed and the Arabian plate collided with the Iranian plate, and was pushed against it, and with the clockwise movement of the Eurasian plate towards the Iranian plate and their final collision, the Iranian plate was pressed from both sides.

The collisions finally caused the folding of the Upper Paleozoic, Mesozoic, and Paleogene rocks and the Cenozoic (chiefly the Eocene) volcanism, to form the Alborz Mountains, primarily during the Miocene. The Alpine orogeny began, therefore, with Eocene volcanism in southwestern and south-central parts of the Alborz, and continued with the uplift and folding of the older sedimentary rocks in the northwestern, central and eastern parts of the range, during the most important orogenic phases, which date from the Miocene and Pliocene epochs.

== Ecoregions, flora and fauna ==
While the southern slopes of the Alborz Mountains are usually semiarid or arid, with irregular and low precipitation, the northern slopes of the range are usually humid, especially in the western parts of the Central Alborz. The Alborz is the easternmost extent of many European plant species. In the southern slopes or the Elburz Range forest steppe ecoregion, the higher elevations are arid with few trees. Juniper is the most common tree in inaccessible areas and at high elevation, while common shrubs are pistachio, maple, and almond. But in the northern slopes, the Caspian Hyrcanian mixed forests ecoregion is lush and forested. The natural vegetation of this region grows in distinct zones:

- Hyrcanian forests on the lowest levels,
- beech forests in the middle zone,
- oak forests in higher regions.

The wild cypress is the dominant form of vegetation in some valleys, while olive trees grow in the western valleys of the Central Alborz near the Sefidrud. The bezoar ibex, Blanford's fox, Rüppell's fox, red fox, Persian fallow deer, wild boar, Syrian brown bear, Persian leopard, Indian wolf, buzzard, geese, woodpecker, griffon vulture, and eagle are among important animals and birds found in the Alborz Mountains. The extinct Caspian tiger also lived in the Alborz Mountains.

== Prehistory ==
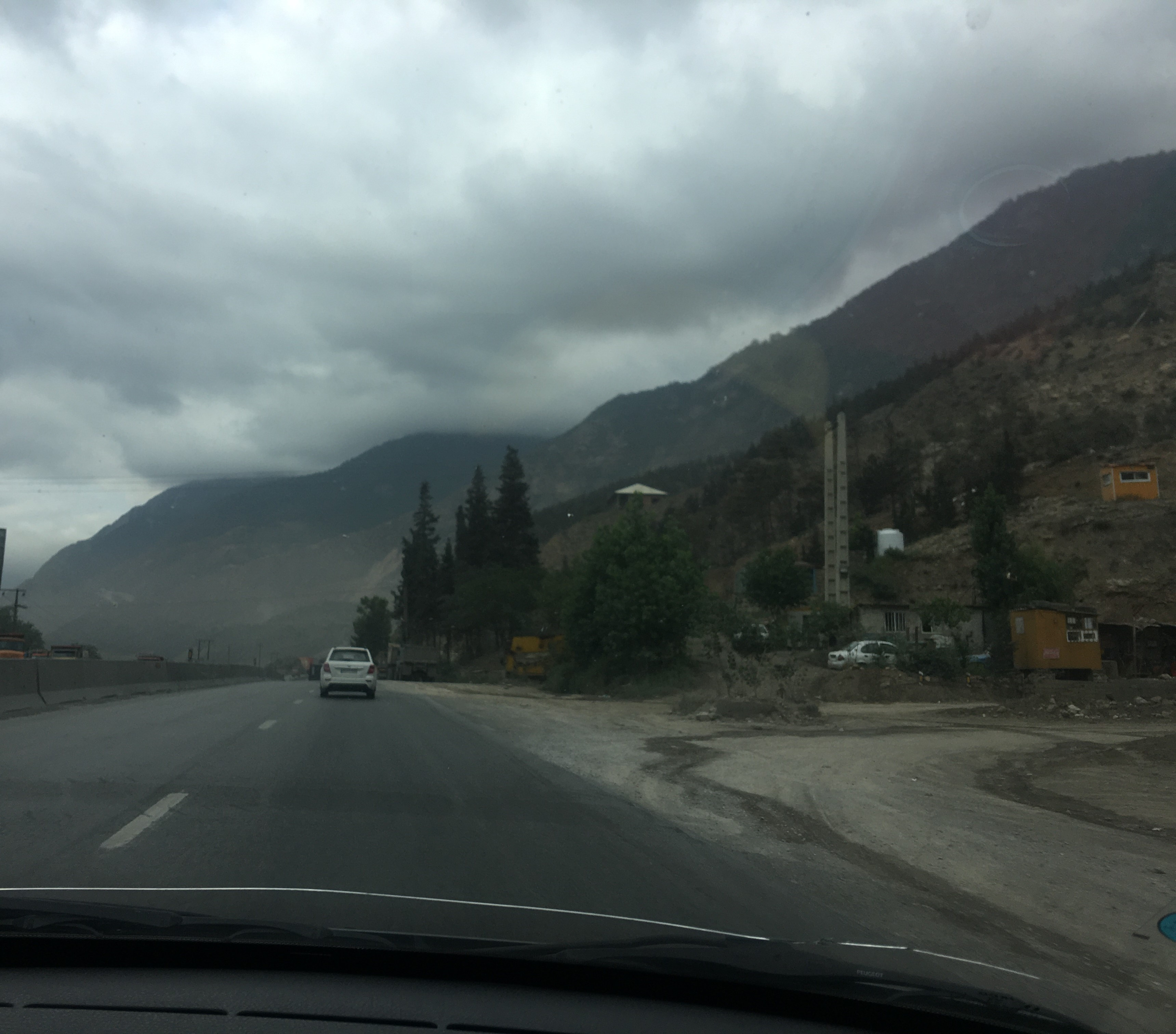
Alborz mountains in Amol county, Mazandaran, Iran. taken from Haraz road

Archaeological evidence from Alborz indicates that early human groups have been present in the region since at least late Lower Paleolithic. The Darband Cave located at the Gilan Province contains evidence for late Lower Paleolithic. Stone artifacts and animal fossils were discovered by a group of archaeologists of the Department of Paleolithic of the National Museum of Iran and ICHTO of Gilan. The presence of large numbers of cave bear and brown bear remains and sparse stone artifacts at the site indicates that Darband primarily represents a bear den. The co-occurrence of artifacts and bear bones does not imply human predation or scavenging. Because there are no clear cut marks, except a few burning signs on the bear bones, they probably accumulated through natural processes. During Middle Paleolithic period, Neanderthals were most probably were present in the region as their fossil have been found at northwest of Alborz, in the Azykh Cave. Their stone tools found in the Buzeir Cave and Kiaram cave and number of other surveyed sites. Evidence for Modern human comes from a river side site called Garm Roud in the Mazandaran Province which dates back to about 30,000 years ago.

== Ski resorts ==
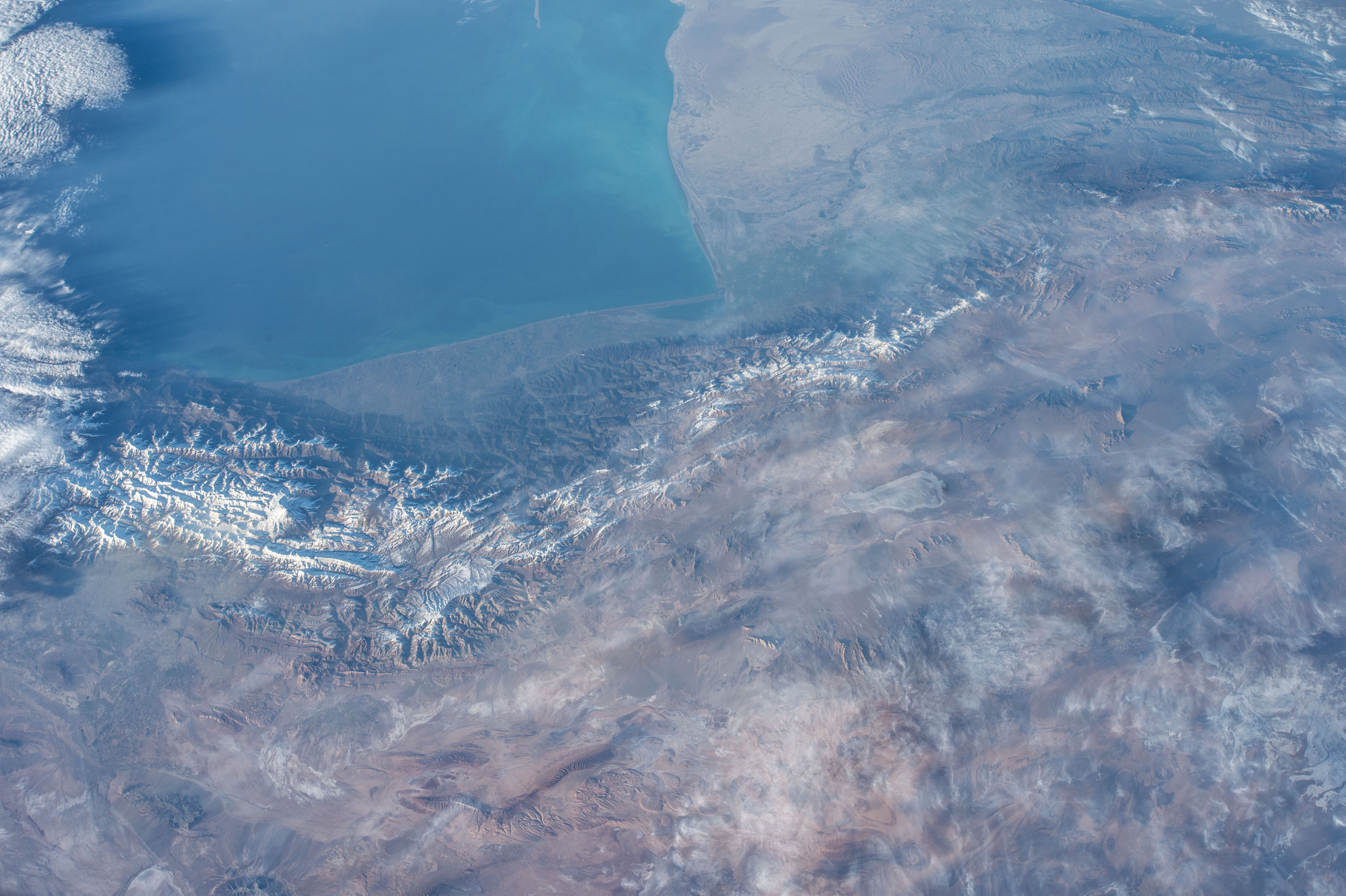
Alborz mountain range and Caspian Sea from space station

Due to the snowy winters of the Alborz Mountains, there are several ski resorts in different places across the range. Some of them, according to ski enthusiasts, are among the best in the world.

== Mounts, summits, alpine lakes and attractions ==
The Alborz four-thousanders with at least 300 meters of topographic prominence:

	Name	Height (m)	Prominence (m)
1	Damavand	5610	4661
2	Alam-Kuh	4850	1848
3	Kalahoo	4412	345
4	Azad Kuh	4398	980
5	Kholeno	4375	746
6	Do Khaharan	4310	644
7	Avidar	4286	503
8	Great Nazer	4260	510
9	Kaman-Kuh	4234	533
10	Zarrin-Kuh	4198	451
11	Sarakchal	4194	317
12	Sialan	4160	1160
13	Kolunbastak	4156	359
14	Shah Alborz	4125	931
15	Naz	4108	1018
16	Do Berar	4082	1352
17	Kahoun	4075	342
18	Varavašt	4025	852
19	Korma-Kuh	4020	359
20	Parchenan	4015	1144
21	Saat	4003	428

The peaks with altitude of 3800 m - 4000 m, with at least 300 meters of topographic prominence:

	Name	Height (m)	Prominence (m)
1	Mishineh Marg	3990	562
2	Tochal	3964	1164
3	Karkas Neshin	3950	537
4	Khashechal	3945	645
5	Vantar	3944	544
	South Kharsang	3940	293
6	Sechal	3936	436
7	Sineza	3933	336
8	Shahvar	3932	1923
9	Mehrchal	3912	759
10	Keyoonchal	3910	390
11	Pashooreh	3896	814
12	Small Nazer	3881	444
13	Gavingchal	3880	344
14	Deev Asiab (Alarm)	3880	421
15	Zarrin-Kuh	3850	858
	Kushgak (Sorkhak)	3843	299
16	Gavkoshan	3840	1160
17	Khozanak	3840	402
18	Asemankuh	3819	499
19	Lake Tar	3200	500

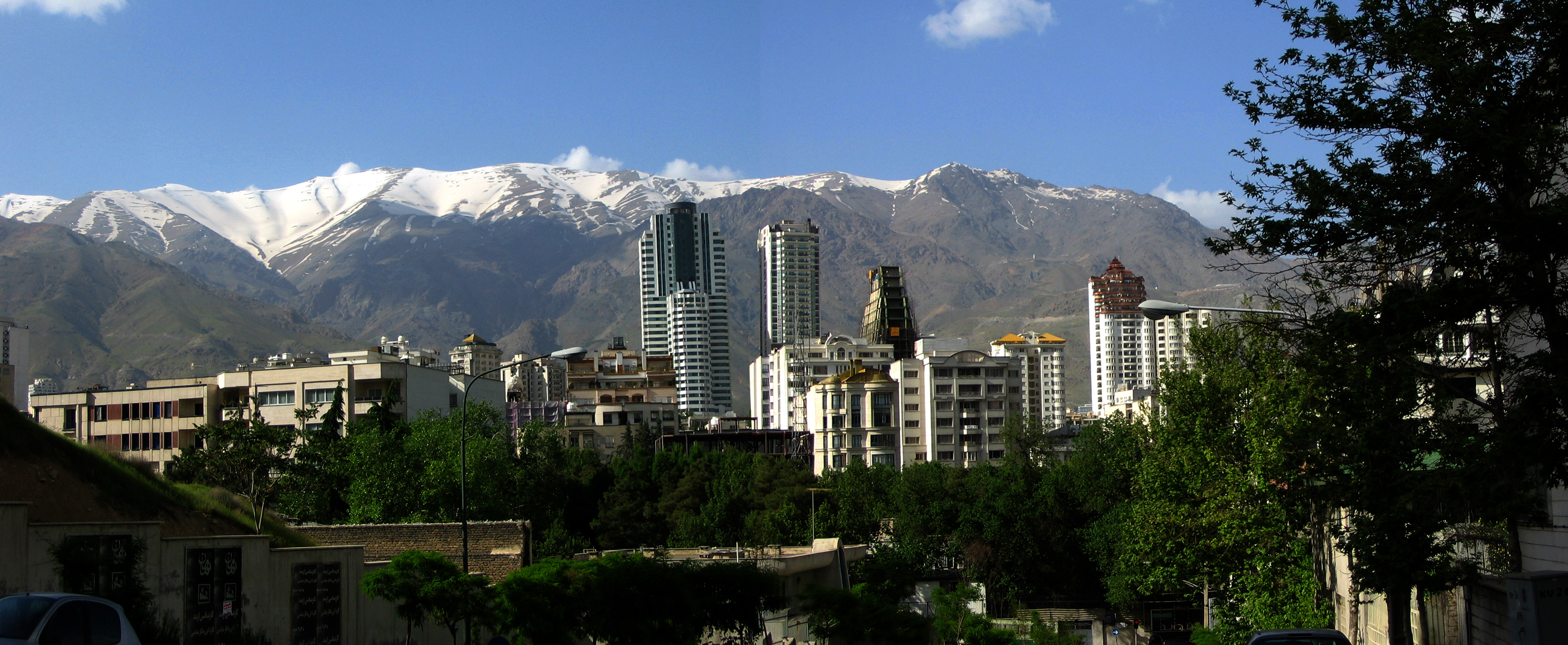
View of Tochal, the closest peak to Tehran.

The peaks with at least 1000 meters of topographic prominence:

	Name	Height (m)	Prominence (m)
1	Damavand	5610	4661
2	Shahvar	3932	1923
3	Alam-Kuh	4850	1848
4	Neyzeva	3730	1510
5	Do Berar	4082	1352
6	Tochal	3964	1164
7	Sialan	4160	1160
8	Gavkoshan	3840	1160
9	Parchenan	4015	1144
10	Shahdar Kuh	3252	1107
11	Ghadamgah	3563	1057
12	Badleh Kuh	3203	1036
13	Naz	4108	1018

- Mount Damavand Amol Mazandaran
- Tochal mount and summit
- Tangeh Savashi, a popular attraction
- Alam Kuh, a mountain in Alborz mountain range
- Alamut
- Dizin
- Ovan lake

Map of central Alborz	Peaks:	1 Alam-Kuh
−25 to 500 m (−82 to 1,640 ft) 500 to 1,500 m (1,600 to 4,900 ft) 1,500 to 2,500 m (4,900 to 8,200 ft) 2,500 to 3,500 m (8,200 to 11,500 ft) 3,500 to 4,500 m (11,500 to 14,800 ft) 4,500 to 5,610 m (14,760 to 18,410 ft)	2 Azad Kuh	3 Damavand
−25 to 500 m (−82 to 1,640 ft) 500 to 1,500 m (1,600 to 4,900 ft) 1,500 to 2,500 m (4,900 to 8,200 ft) 2,500 to 3,500 m (8,200 to 11,500 ft) 3,500 to 4,500 m (11,500 to 14,800 ft) 4,500 to 5,610 m (14,760 to 18,410 ft)	4 Do Berar	5 Do Khaharan
−25 to 500 m (−82 to 1,640 ft) 500 to 1,500 m (1,600 to 4,900 ft) 1,500 to 2,500 m (4,900 to 8,200 ft) 2,500 to 3,500 m (8,200 to 11,500 ft) 3,500 to 4,500 m (11,500 to 14,800 ft) 4,500 to 5,610 m (14,760 to 18,410 ft)	6 Ghal'eh Gardan	7 Gorg
−25 to 500 m (−82 to 1,640 ft) 500 to 1,500 m (1,600 to 4,900 ft) 1,500 to 2,500 m (4,900 to 8,200 ft) 2,500 to 3,500 m (8,200 to 11,500 ft) 3,500 to 4,500 m (11,500 to 14,800 ft) 4,500 to 5,610 m (14,760 to 18,410 ft)	8 Kholeno	9 Mehr Chal
−25 to 500 m (−82 to 1,640 ft) 500 to 1,500 m (1,600 to 4,900 ft) 1,500 to 2,500 m (4,900 to 8,200 ft) 2,500 to 3,500 m (8,200 to 11,500 ft) 3,500 to 4,500 m (11,500 to 14,800 ft) 4,500 to 5,610 m (14,760 to 18,410 ft)	10 Mishineh Marg	11 Naz
−25 to 500 m (−82 to 1,640 ft) 500 to 1,500 m (1,600 to 4,900 ft) 1,500 to 2,500 m (4,900 to 8,200 ft) 2,500 to 3,500 m (8,200 to 11,500 ft) 3,500 to 4,500 m (11,500 to 14,800 ft) 4,500 to 5,610 m (14,760 to 18,410 ft)	12 Shah Alborz	13 Sialan
−25 to 500 m (−82 to 1,640 ft) 500 to 1,500 m (1,600 to 4,900 ft) 1,500 to 2,500 m (4,900 to 8,200 ft) 2,500 to 3,500 m (8,200 to 11,500 ft) 3,500 to 4,500 m (11,500 to 14,800 ft) 4,500 to 5,610 m (14,760 to 18,410 ft)	14 Tochal	15 Varavašt
−25 to 500 m (−82 to 1,640 ft) 500 to 1,500 m (1,600 to 4,900 ft) 1,500 to 2,500 m (4,900 to 8,200 ft) 2,500 to 3,500 m (8,200 to 11,500 ft) 3,500 to 4,500 m (11,500 to 14,800 ft) 4,500 to 5,610 m (14,760 to 18,410 ft)	Rivers:	0
−25 to 500 m (−82 to 1,640 ft) 500 to 1,500 m (1,600 to 4,900 ft) 1,500 to 2,500 m (4,900 to 8,200 ft) 2,500 to 3,500 m (8,200 to 11,500 ft) 3,500 to 4,500 m (11,500 to 14,800 ft) 4,500 to 5,610 m (14,760 to 18,410 ft)	1 Alamut	2 Chalus
−25 to 500 m (−82 to 1,640 ft) 500 to 1,500 m (1,600 to 4,900 ft) 1,500 to 2,500 m (4,900 to 8,200 ft) 2,500 to 3,500 m (8,200 to 11,500 ft) 3,500 to 4,500 m (11,500 to 14,800 ft) 4,500 to 5,610 m (14,760 to 18,410 ft)	3 Do Hezar	4 Haraz
−25 to 500 m (−82 to 1,640 ft) 500 to 1,500 m (1,600 to 4,900 ft) 1,500 to 2,500 m (4,900 to 8,200 ft) 2,500 to 3,500 m (8,200 to 11,500 ft) 3,500 to 4,500 m (11,500 to 14,800 ft) 4,500 to 5,610 m (14,760 to 18,410 ft)	5 Jajrood	6 Karaj
−25 to 500 m (−82 to 1,640 ft) 500 to 1,500 m (1,600 to 4,900 ft) 1,500 to 2,500 m (4,900 to 8,200 ft) 2,500 to 3,500 m (8,200 to 11,500 ft) 3,500 to 4,500 m (11,500 to 14,800 ft) 4,500 to 5,610 m (14,760 to 18,410 ft)	7 Kojoor	8 Lar
−25 to 500 m (−82 to 1,640 ft) 500 to 1,500 m (1,600 to 4,900 ft) 1,500 to 2,500 m (4,900 to 8,200 ft) 2,500 to 3,500 m (8,200 to 11,500 ft) 3,500 to 4,500 m (11,500 to 14,800 ft) 4,500 to 5,610 m (14,760 to 18,410 ft)	9 Noor	10 Sardab
−25 to 500 m (−82 to 1,640 ft) 500 to 1,500 m (1,600 to 4,900 ft) 1,500 to 2,500 m (4,900 to 8,200 ft) 2,500 to 3,500 m (8,200 to 11,500 ft) 3,500 to 4,500 m (11,500 to 14,800 ft) 4,500 to 5,610 m (14,760 to 18,410 ft)	11 Seh Hazar	12 Shahrood
−25 to 500 m (−82 to 1,640 ft) 500 to 1,500 m (1,600 to 4,900 ft) 1,500 to 2,500 m (4,900 to 8,200 ft) 2,500 to 3,500 m (8,200 to 11,500 ft) 3,500 to 4,500 m (11,500 to 14,800 ft) 4,500 to 5,610 m (14,760 to 18,410 ft)	Cities:	1 Amol
−25 to 500 m (−82 to 1,640 ft) 500 to 1,500 m (1,600 to 4,900 ft) 1,500 to 2,500 m (4,900 to 8,200 ft) 2,500 to 3,500 m (8,200 to 11,500 ft) 3,500 to 4,500 m (11,500 to 14,800 ft) 4,500 to 5,610 m (14,760 to 18,410 ft)	2 Chalus	3 Karaj
−25 to 500 m (−82 to 1,640 ft) 500 to 1,500 m (1,600 to 4,900 ft) 1,500 to 2,500 m (4,900 to 8,200 ft) 2,500 to 3,500 m (8,200 to 11,500 ft) 3,500 to 4,500 m (11,500 to 14,800 ft) 4,500 to 5,610 m (14,760 to 18,410 ft)	Other:	D Dizin
−25 to 500 m (−82 to 1,640 ft) 500 to 1,500 m (1,600 to 4,900 ft) 1,500 to 2,500 m (4,900 to 8,200 ft) 2,500 to 3,500 m (8,200 to 11,500 ft) 3,500 to 4,500 m (11,500 to 14,800 ft) 4,500 to 5,610 m (14,760 to 18,410 ft)	E Emamzadeh Hashem	K Kandovan Tunnel
−25 to 500 m (−82 to 1,640 ft) 500 to 1,500 m (1,600 to 4,900 ft) 1,500 to 2,500 m (4,900 to 8,200 ft) 2,500 to 3,500 m (8,200 to 11,500 ft) 3,500 to 4,500 m (11,500 to 14,800 ft) 4,500 to 5,610 m (14,760 to 18,410 ft)	* Latyan Dam	** Lar Dam

== See also ==
- List of Iranian four-thousanders
- List of mountains in Iran
- Kayanian dynasty
- The Clouds Forest
- Koh e Alborz

== Sources ==
- North, S.J.R., Guide to Biblical Iran, Rome 1956, p. 50
