= Azad Kooh =

Mountain in Iran

- آزادکوه (Persian)
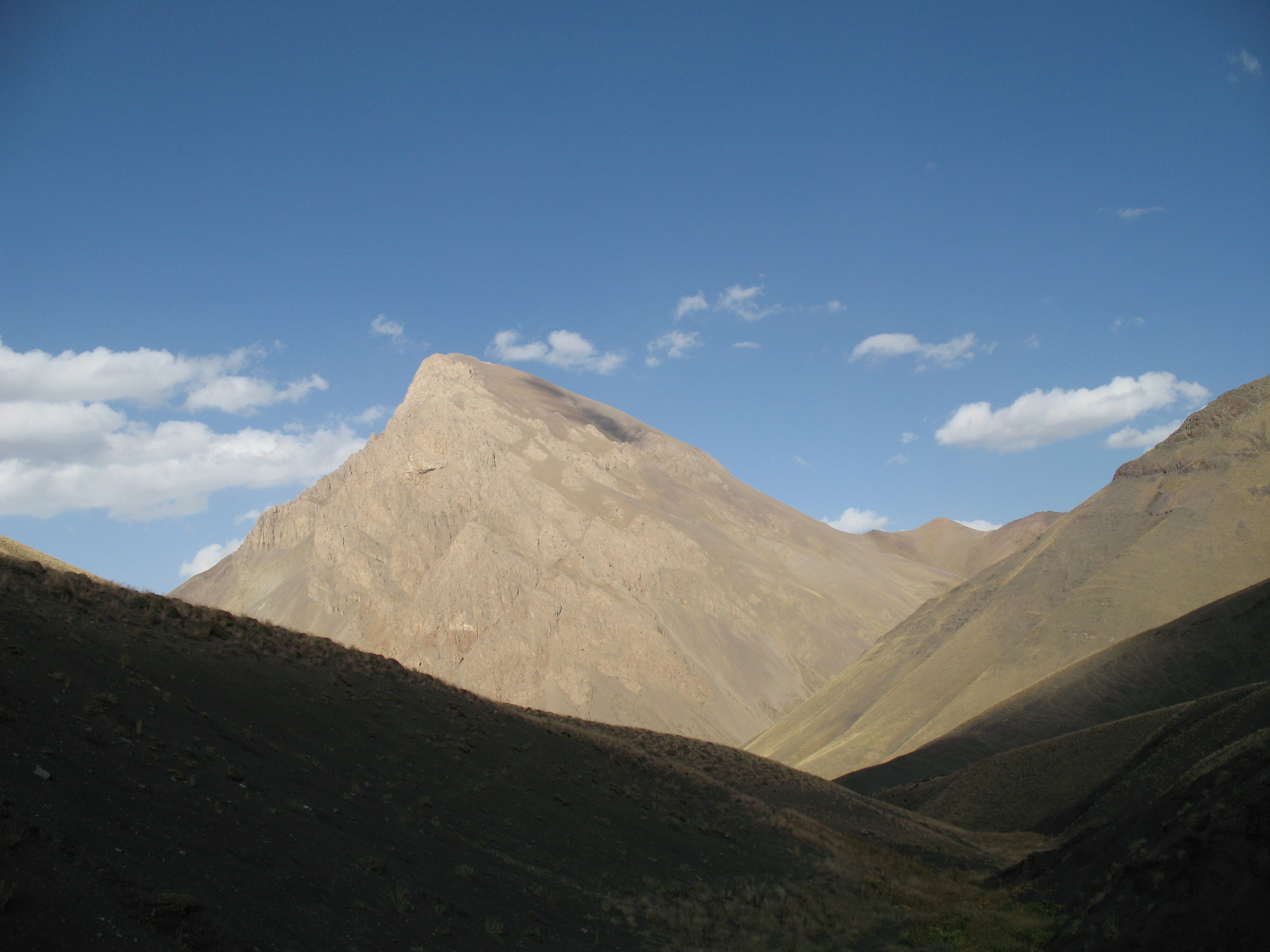

Highest point
- Elevation: 4,355 m (14,288 ft)
- Prominence: 757 m (2,484 ft)
- Coordinates: 36°10′N 51°30′E

Geography
- Location within Iran
- Location: Mazandaran, Iran
- Parent range: Alborz

Climbing
- Easiest route: Kalaak-e Baalaa

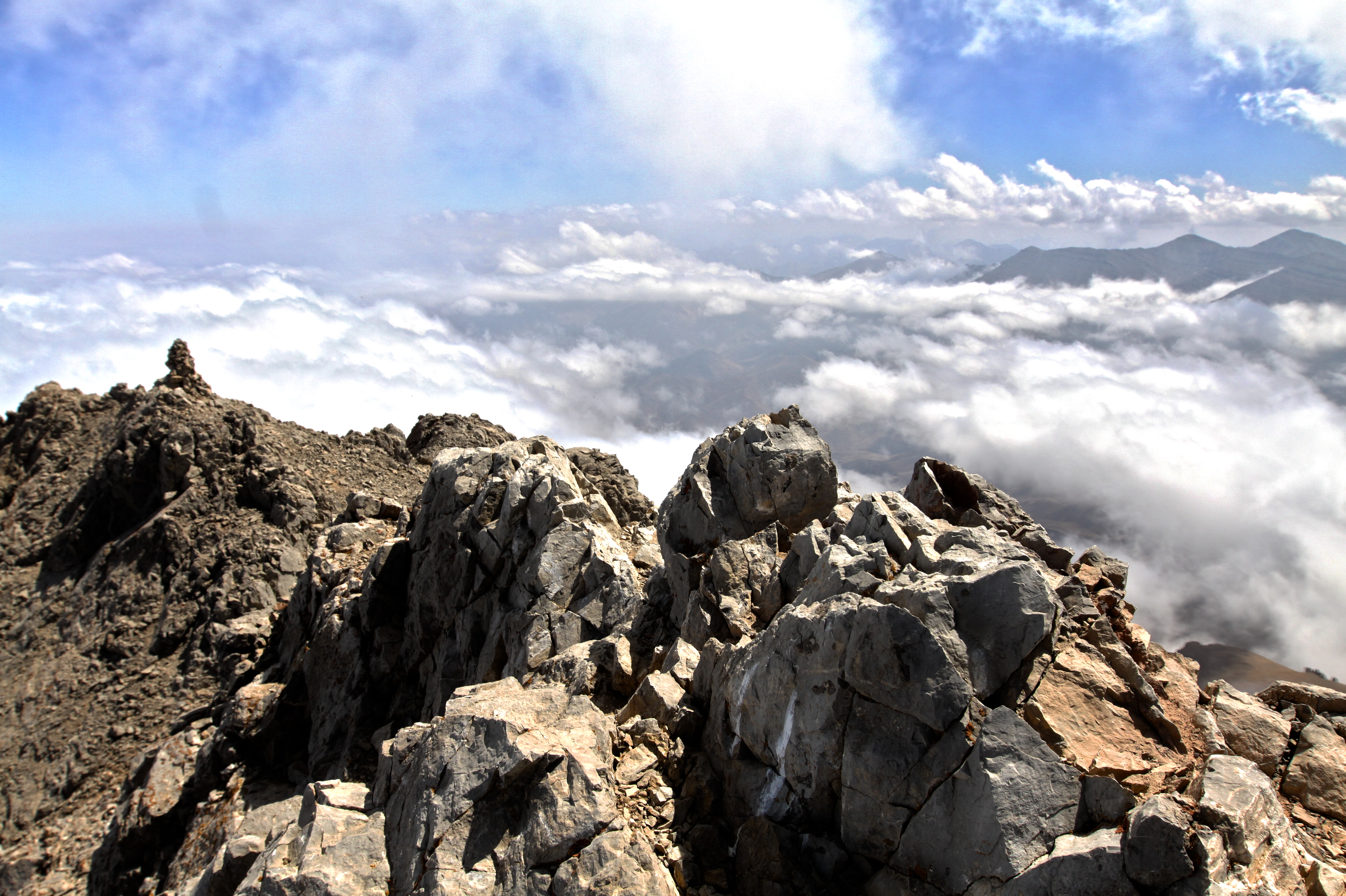
Azad Kooh Summit, Mazandaran, Iran

Azad Kooh (Persian: آزادکوه, lit. 'Free Mountain') is one of the highest peaks in the central Alborz Range in Mazandaran province in northern Iran.

== Climbing Azad Kooh ==
There are two routes for climbing this peak.

== Gallery ==
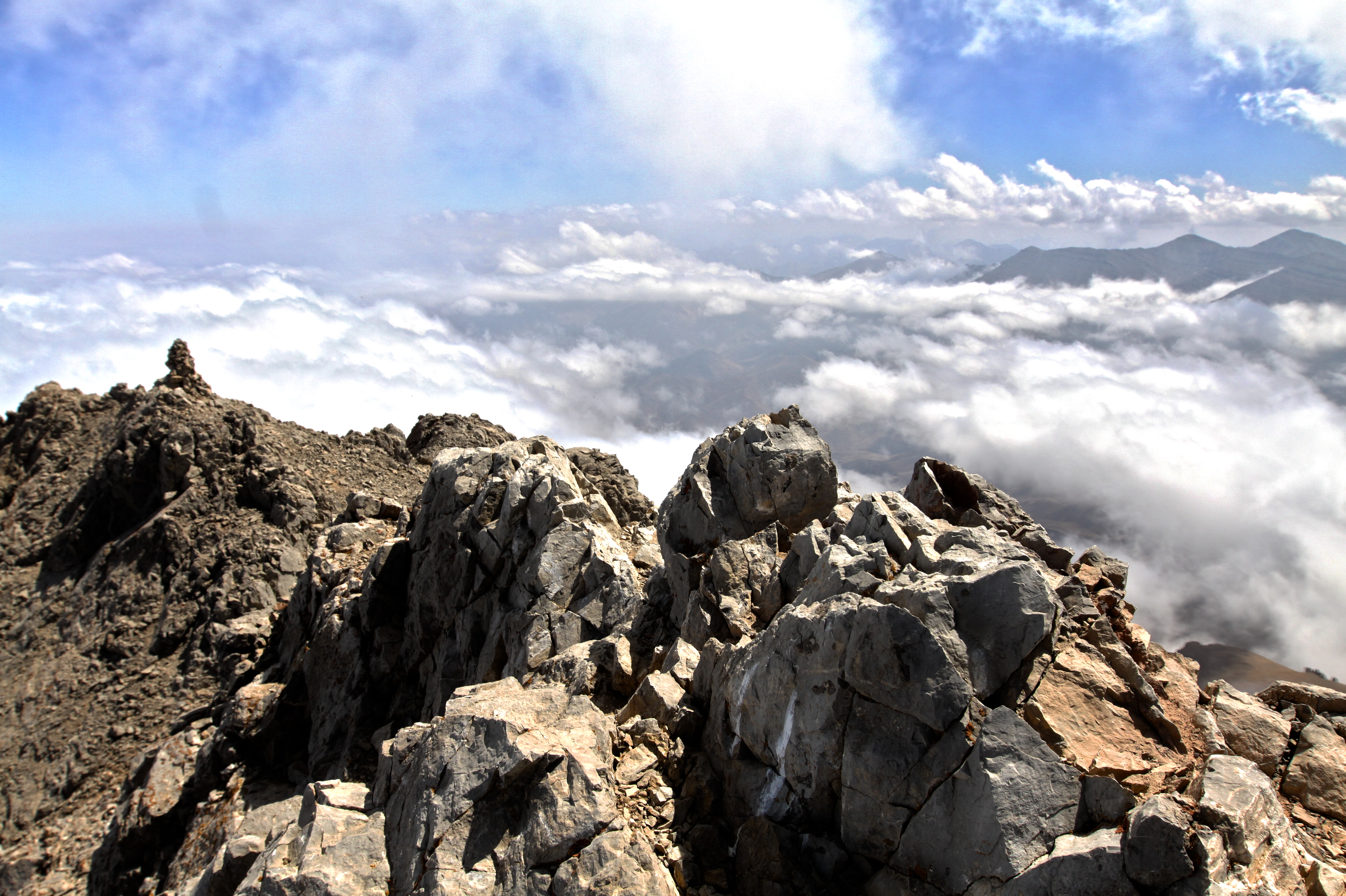
Azad Kooh, Mazandaran, Iran

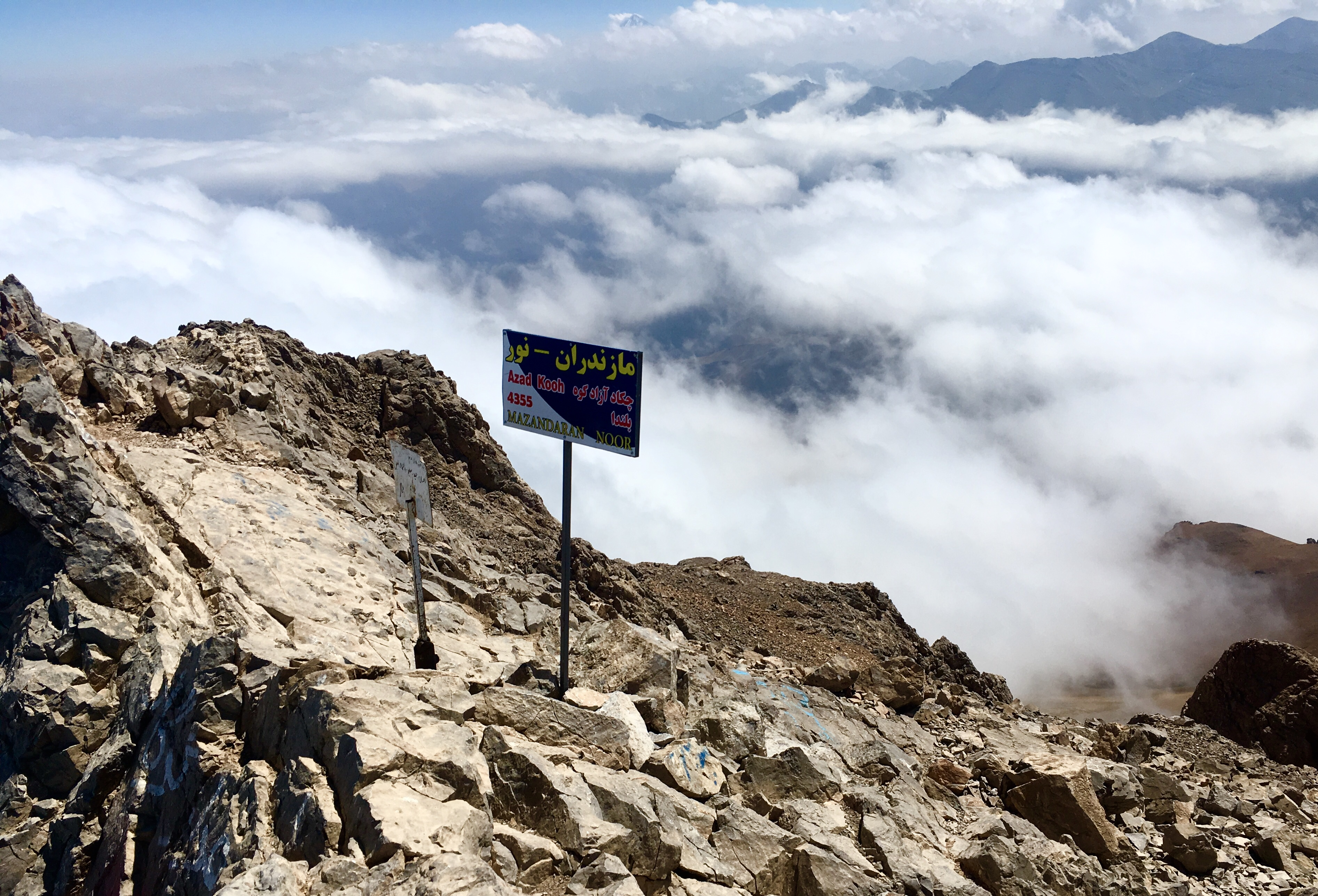
Azad Kooh, Mazandaran, Iran

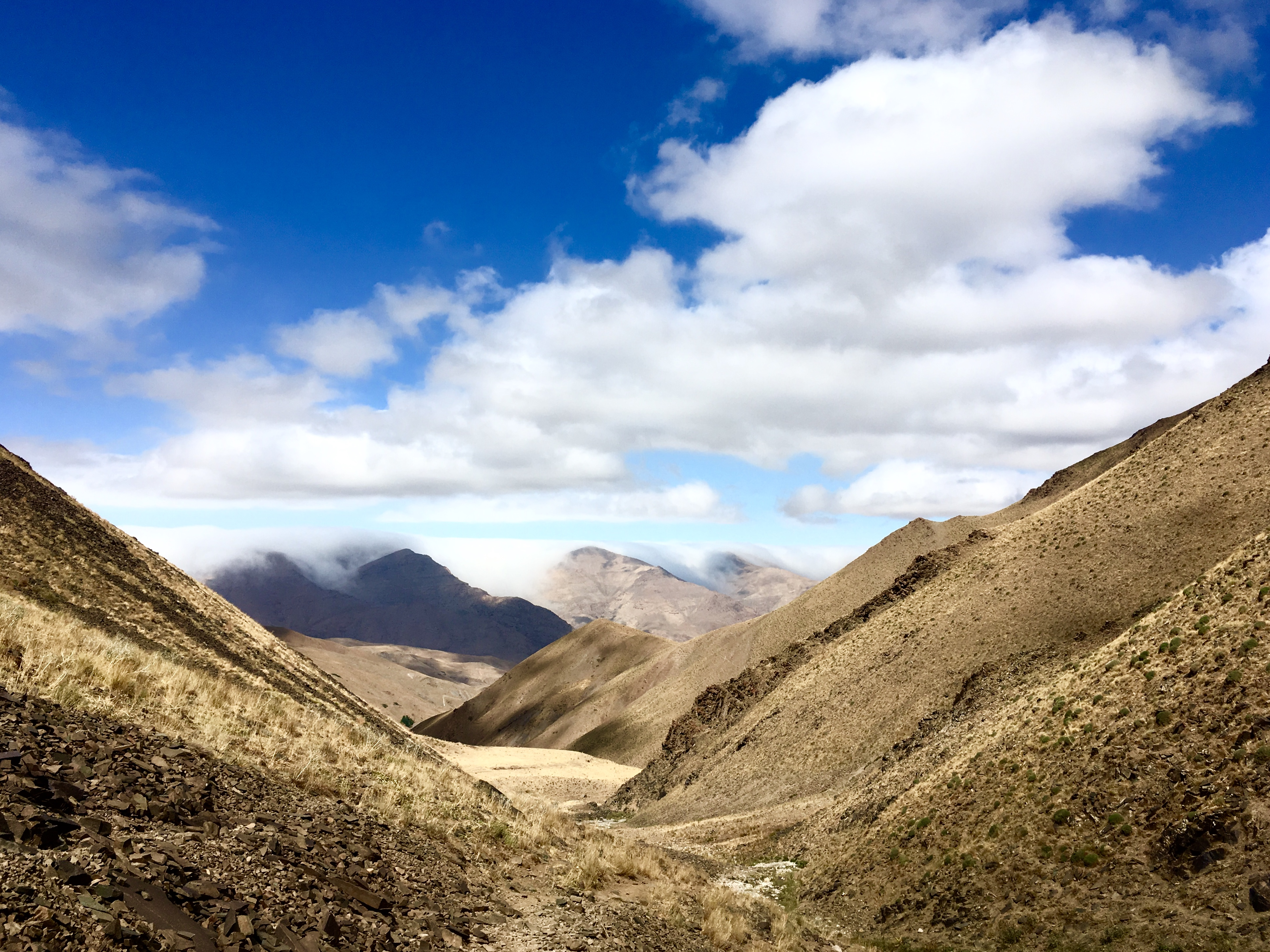
Kalak Valley, Azad kooh Mountain, Mazandaran, Iran

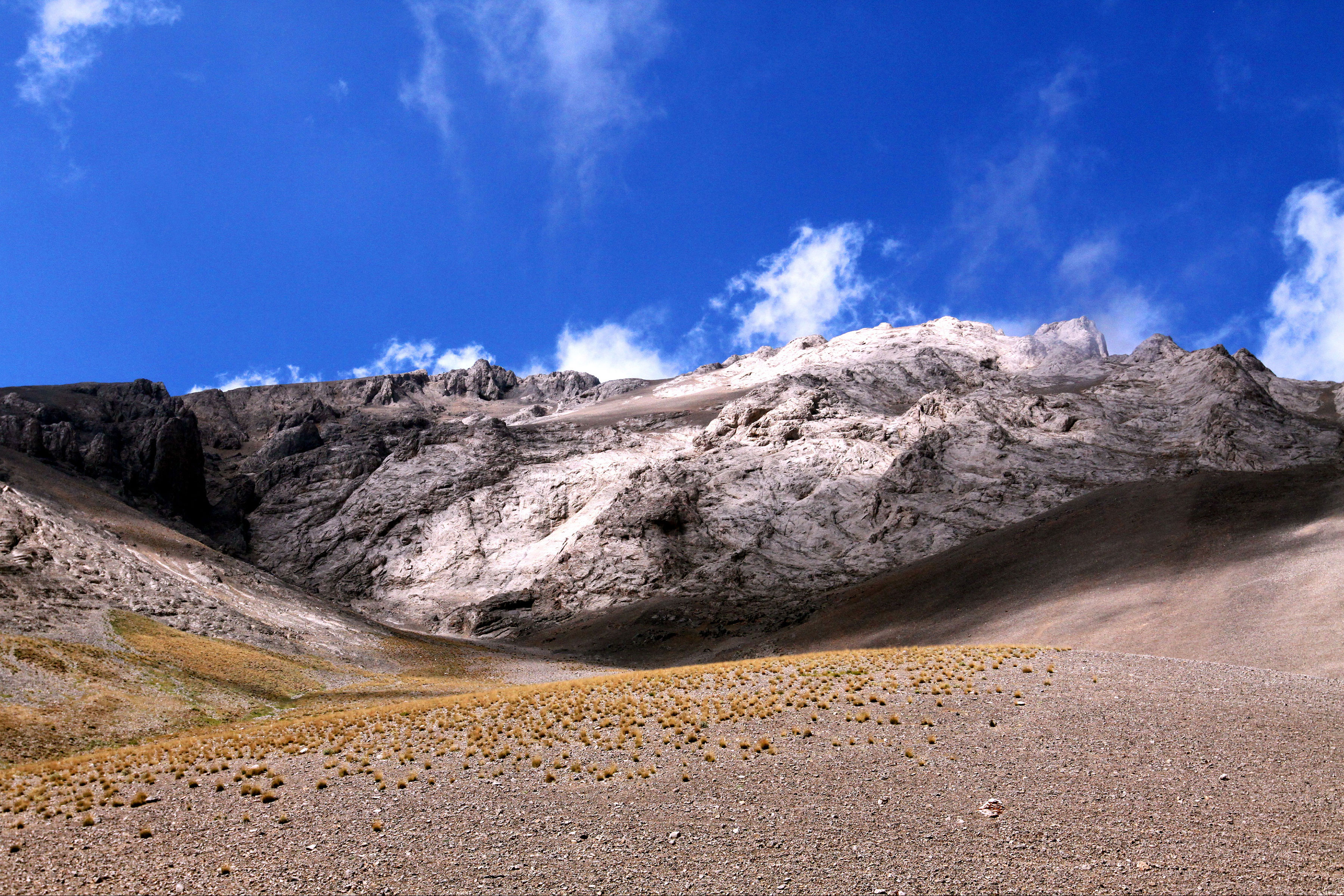
Kalak Valley, Azad kooh Mountain, Mazandaran, Iran
