= Koh e Alburz (Balkh) =

Mountain ridge in Afghanistan

- (Dari: کوه البرز)
- Location within Afghanistan

Highest point
- Elevation: 1,032 m (3,386 ft)
- Parent peak: Hindu Kush
- Coordinates: 36°34′12″N 66°52′12″E

Geography
- Location: Balkh Province
- Parent range: Hindu Kush

Koh e Alburz, Romanized as Kuh i Elburz, Gory Koh-i-Elburz, Kohe Alborz, Kuh i Alborz (Dari: کوه البرز high mountain) is a mountain a ridge of the Hindu Kush in Afghanistan, Balkh Province. The ridge is elongated to the south of the ancient city of Balkh, which is about 25 kilometers northwest from the city of Mazar-i-Sharif. It is a tertiary, elongated ridge with steep slopes to the north and south. The comb has short canyons. Between the breaking points are the small river Schadyan and Marmal mountain. The German ISAF troops call their nearby military camp Camp Marmal.
