= Polur, Iran =

Village in Mazandaran province, Iran

Polur Persian: پلور
- Village
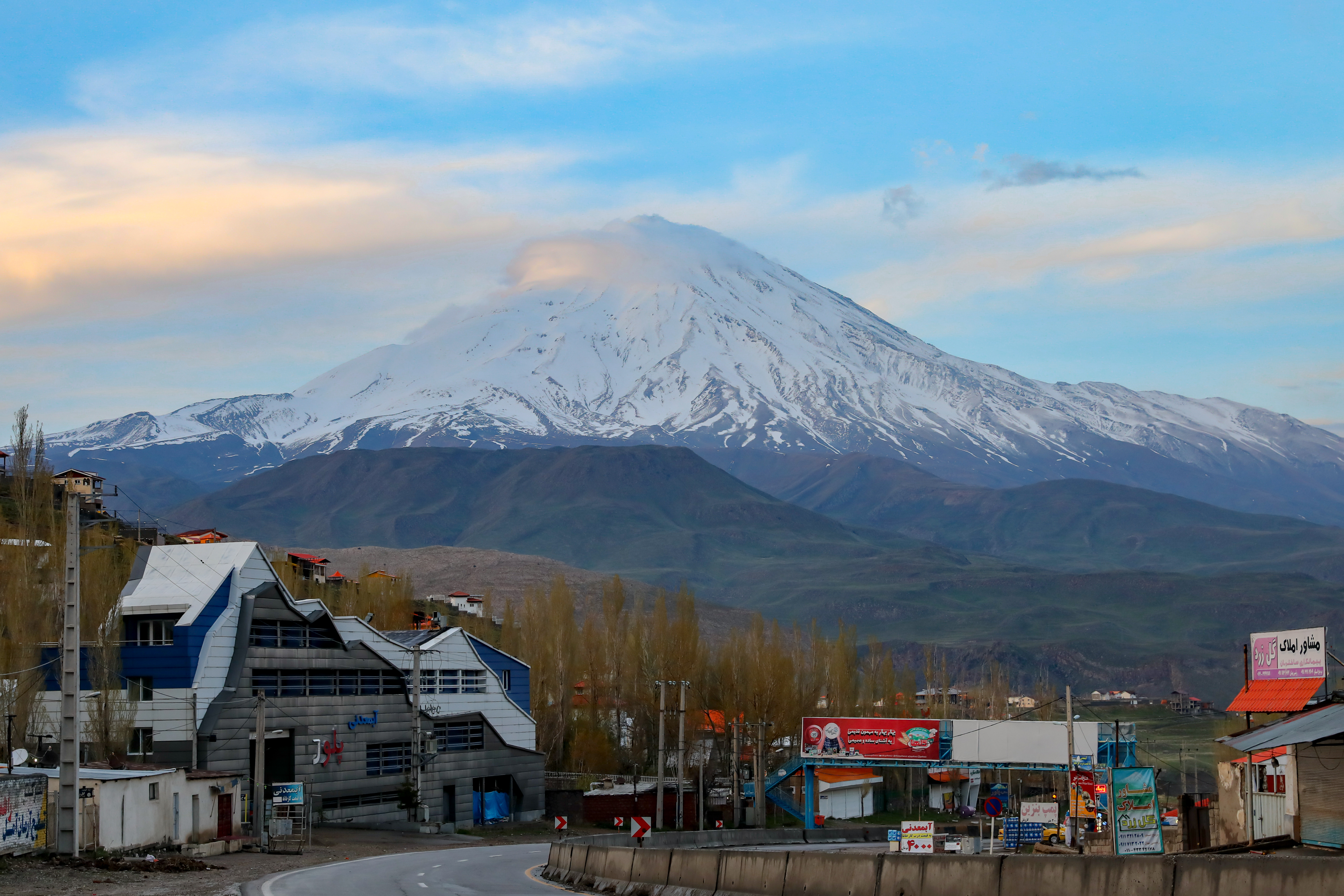
- The village of Polur and the Haraz Road, with Mount Damavand in the background

- Location within Iran
- Coordinates: 35°50′55″N 52°03′01″E
- Country: Iran
- Province: Mazandaran
- County: Amol
- District: Larijan
- Rural District: Bala Larijan

Population (2016)
  - Total: 302
- Time zone: UTC+3:30 (IRST)

Polur (Persian: پلور) (Note: Also romanized as Polūr; also known as Pūlūr) is a village on the Haraz River in Bala Larijan Rural District of Larijan District in Amol County, Mazandaran province, Iran.

== Demographics ==
=== Population ===
At the time of the 2006 National Census, the village's population was 316 in 86 households. The following census in 2011 counted 210 people in 72 households. The 2016 census measured the population of the village as 302 people in 151 households.

== Geography ==
The village is located on Road 77 (Haraz Road), the main route from Amol to the Caspian Sea coast. At the 2016 census, its population was 302, in 151 families.

=== Mount Damavand—Alborz Mountains ===
It is well known for being a popular base to climb Mount Damavand in the Lar National Park, part of the Central Alborz mountain range. The 5,610 m (18,410 ft) volcano is the highest point in Iran and in the Middle East region.

Map of central Alborz	Peaks:	1 Alam-Kuh
−25 to 500 m (−82 to 1,640 ft) 500 to 1,500 m (1,600 to 4,900 ft) 1,500 to 2,500 m (4,900 to 8,200 ft) 2,500 to 3,500 m (8,200 to 11,500 ft) 3,500 to 4,500 m (11,500 to 14,800 ft) 4,500 to 5,610 m (14,760 to 18,410 ft)	2 Azad Kuh	3 Damavand
−25 to 500 m (−82 to 1,640 ft) 500 to 1,500 m (1,600 to 4,900 ft) 1,500 to 2,500 m (4,900 to 8,200 ft) 2,500 to 3,500 m (8,200 to 11,500 ft) 3,500 to 4,500 m (11,500 to 14,800 ft) 4,500 to 5,610 m (14,760 to 18,410 ft)	4 Do Berar	5 Do Khaharan
−25 to 500 m (−82 to 1,640 ft) 500 to 1,500 m (1,600 to 4,900 ft) 1,500 to 2,500 m (4,900 to 8,200 ft) 2,500 to 3,500 m (8,200 to 11,500 ft) 3,500 to 4,500 m (11,500 to 14,800 ft) 4,500 to 5,610 m (14,760 to 18,410 ft)	6 Ghal'eh Gardan	7 Gorg
−25 to 500 m (−82 to 1,640 ft) 500 to 1,500 m (1,600 to 4,900 ft) 1,500 to 2,500 m (4,900 to 8,200 ft) 2,500 to 3,500 m (8,200 to 11,500 ft) 3,500 to 4,500 m (11,500 to 14,800 ft) 4,500 to 5,610 m (14,760 to 18,410 ft)	8 Kholeno	9 Mehr Chal
−25 to 500 m (−82 to 1,640 ft) 500 to 1,500 m (1,600 to 4,900 ft) 1,500 to 2,500 m (4,900 to 8,200 ft) 2,500 to 3,500 m (8,200 to 11,500 ft) 3,500 to 4,500 m (11,500 to 14,800 ft) 4,500 to 5,610 m (14,760 to 18,410 ft)	10 Mishineh Marg	11 Naz
−25 to 500 m (−82 to 1,640 ft) 500 to 1,500 m (1,600 to 4,900 ft) 1,500 to 2,500 m (4,900 to 8,200 ft) 2,500 to 3,500 m (8,200 to 11,500 ft) 3,500 to 4,500 m (11,500 to 14,800 ft) 4,500 to 5,610 m (14,760 to 18,410 ft)	12 Shah Alborz	13 Sialan
−25 to 500 m (−82 to 1,640 ft) 500 to 1,500 m (1,600 to 4,900 ft) 1,500 to 2,500 m (4,900 to 8,200 ft) 2,500 to 3,500 m (8,200 to 11,500 ft) 3,500 to 4,500 m (11,500 to 14,800 ft) 4,500 to 5,610 m (14,760 to 18,410 ft)	14 Tochal	15 Varavašt
−25 to 500 m (−82 to 1,640 ft) 500 to 1,500 m (1,600 to 4,900 ft) 1,500 to 2,500 m (4,900 to 8,200 ft) 2,500 to 3,500 m (8,200 to 11,500 ft) 3,500 to 4,500 m (11,500 to 14,800 ft) 4,500 to 5,610 m (14,760 to 18,410 ft)	Rivers:	0
−25 to 500 m (−82 to 1,640 ft) 500 to 1,500 m (1,600 to 4,900 ft) 1,500 to 2,500 m (4,900 to 8,200 ft) 2,500 to 3,500 m (8,200 to 11,500 ft) 3,500 to 4,500 m (11,500 to 14,800 ft) 4,500 to 5,610 m (14,760 to 18,410 ft)	1 Alamut	2 Chalus
−25 to 500 m (−82 to 1,640 ft) 500 to 1,500 m (1,600 to 4,900 ft) 1,500 to 2,500 m (4,900 to 8,200 ft) 2,500 to 3,500 m (8,200 to 11,500 ft) 3,500 to 4,500 m (11,500 to 14,800 ft) 4,500 to 5,610 m (14,760 to 18,410 ft)	3 Do Hezar	4 Haraz
−25 to 500 m (−82 to 1,640 ft) 500 to 1,500 m (1,600 to 4,900 ft) 1,500 to 2,500 m (4,900 to 8,200 ft) 2,500 to 3,500 m (8,200 to 11,500 ft) 3,500 to 4,500 m (11,500 to 14,800 ft) 4,500 to 5,610 m (14,760 to 18,410 ft)	5 Jajrood	6 Karaj
−25 to 500 m (−82 to 1,640 ft) 500 to 1,500 m (1,600 to 4,900 ft) 1,500 to 2,500 m (4,900 to 8,200 ft) 2,500 to 3,500 m (8,200 to 11,500 ft) 3,500 to 4,500 m (11,500 to 14,800 ft) 4,500 to 5,610 m (14,760 to 18,410 ft)	7 Kojoor	8 Lar
−25 to 500 m (−82 to 1,640 ft) 500 to 1,500 m (1,600 to 4,900 ft) 1,500 to 2,500 m (4,900 to 8,200 ft) 2,500 to 3,500 m (8,200 to 11,500 ft) 3,500 to 4,500 m (11,500 to 14,800 ft) 4,500 to 5,610 m (14,760 to 18,410 ft)	9 Noor	10 Sardab
−25 to 500 m (−82 to 1,640 ft) 500 to 1,500 m (1,600 to 4,900 ft) 1,500 to 2,500 m (4,900 to 8,200 ft) 2,500 to 3,500 m (8,200 to 11,500 ft) 3,500 to 4,500 m (11,500 to 14,800 ft) 4,500 to 5,610 m (14,760 to 18,410 ft)	11 Seh Hazar	12 Shahrood
−25 to 500 m (−82 to 1,640 ft) 500 to 1,500 m (1,600 to 4,900 ft) 1,500 to 2,500 m (4,900 to 8,200 ft) 2,500 to 3,500 m (8,200 to 11,500 ft) 3,500 to 4,500 m (11,500 to 14,800 ft) 4,500 to 5,610 m (14,760 to 18,410 ft)	Cities:	1 Amol
−25 to 500 m (−82 to 1,640 ft) 500 to 1,500 m (1,600 to 4,900 ft) 1,500 to 2,500 m (4,900 to 8,200 ft) 2,500 to 3,500 m (8,200 to 11,500 ft) 3,500 to 4,500 m (11,500 to 14,800 ft) 4,500 to 5,610 m (14,760 to 18,410 ft)	2 Chalus	3 Karaj
−25 to 500 m (−82 to 1,640 ft) 500 to 1,500 m (1,600 to 4,900 ft) 1,500 to 2,500 m (4,900 to 8,200 ft) 2,500 to 3,500 m (8,200 to 11,500 ft) 3,500 to 4,500 m (11,500 to 14,800 ft) 4,500 to 5,610 m (14,760 to 18,410 ft)	Other:	D Dizin
−25 to 500 m (−82 to 1,640 ft) 500 to 1,500 m (1,600 to 4,900 ft) 1,500 to 2,500 m (4,900 to 8,200 ft) 2,500 to 3,500 m (8,200 to 11,500 ft) 3,500 to 4,500 m (11,500 to 14,800 ft) 4,500 to 5,610 m (14,760 to 18,410 ft)	E Emamzadeh Hashem	K Kandovan Tunnel
−25 to 500 m (−82 to 1,640 ft) 500 to 1,500 m (1,600 to 4,900 ft) 1,500 to 2,500 m (4,900 to 8,200 ft) 2,500 to 3,500 m (8,200 to 11,500 ft) 3,500 to 4,500 m (11,500 to 14,800 ft) 4,500 to 5,610 m (14,760 to 18,410 ft)	* Latyan Dam	** Lar Dam

== Gallery ==
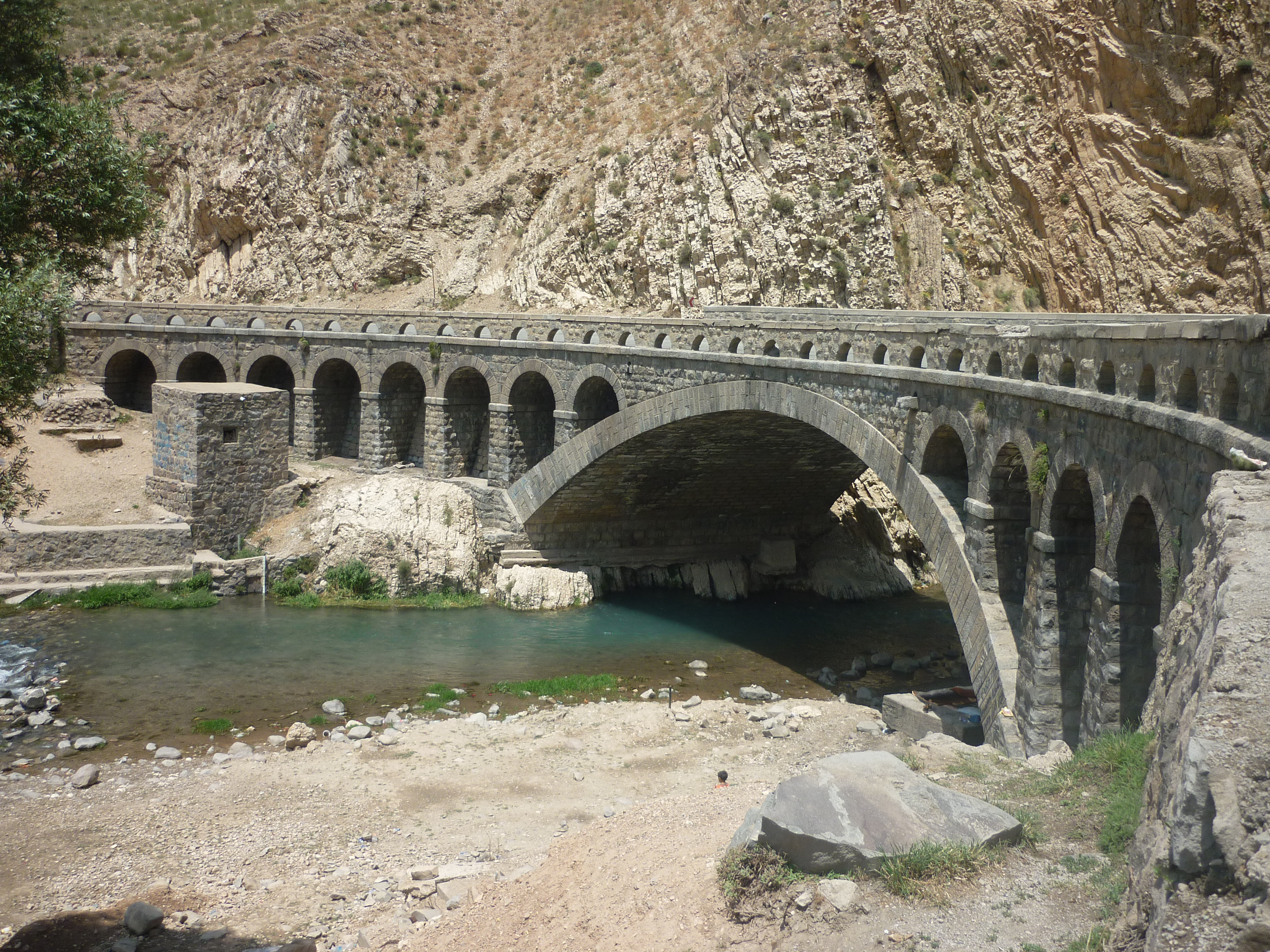
Shahi Bridge crossing the Haraz River in Polur.

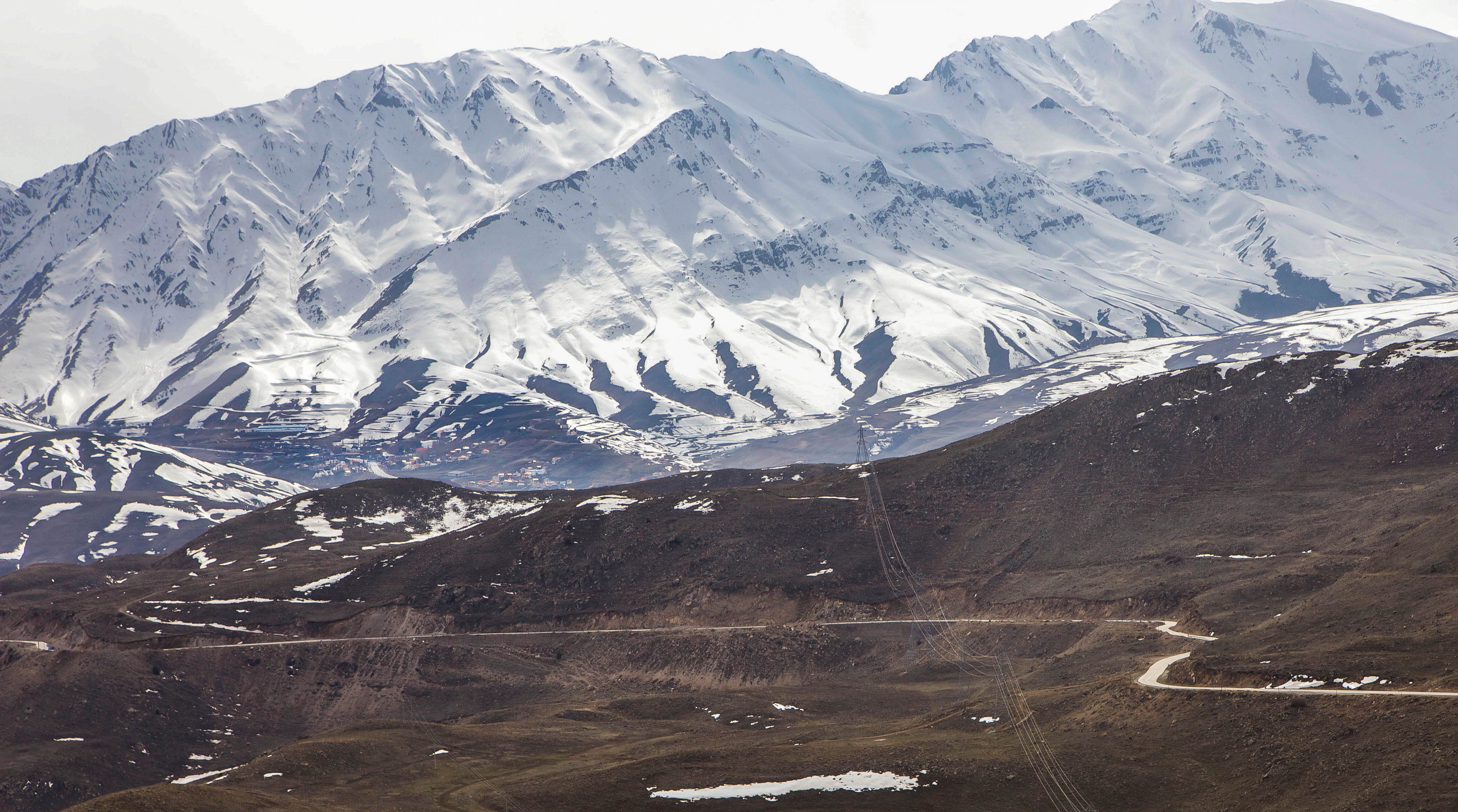
Alborz mountain range and Lar National Park from Polur.

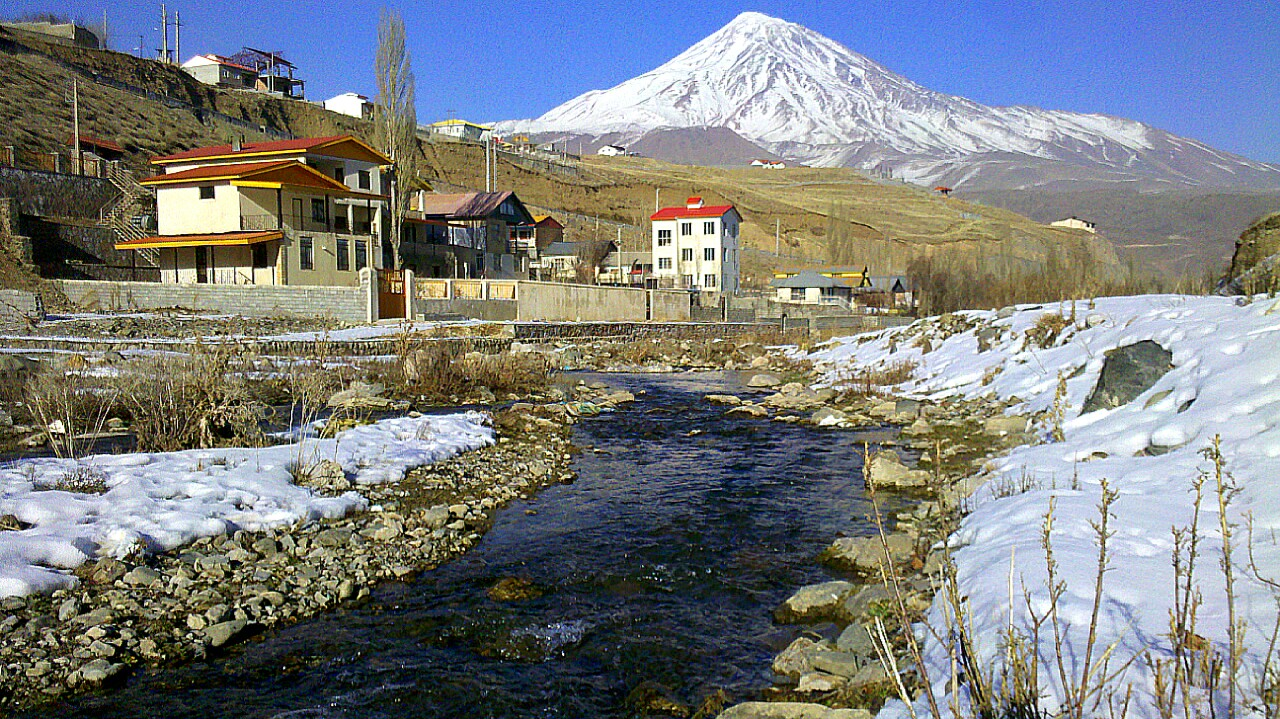
Haraz River and Mount Damavand from Polur.

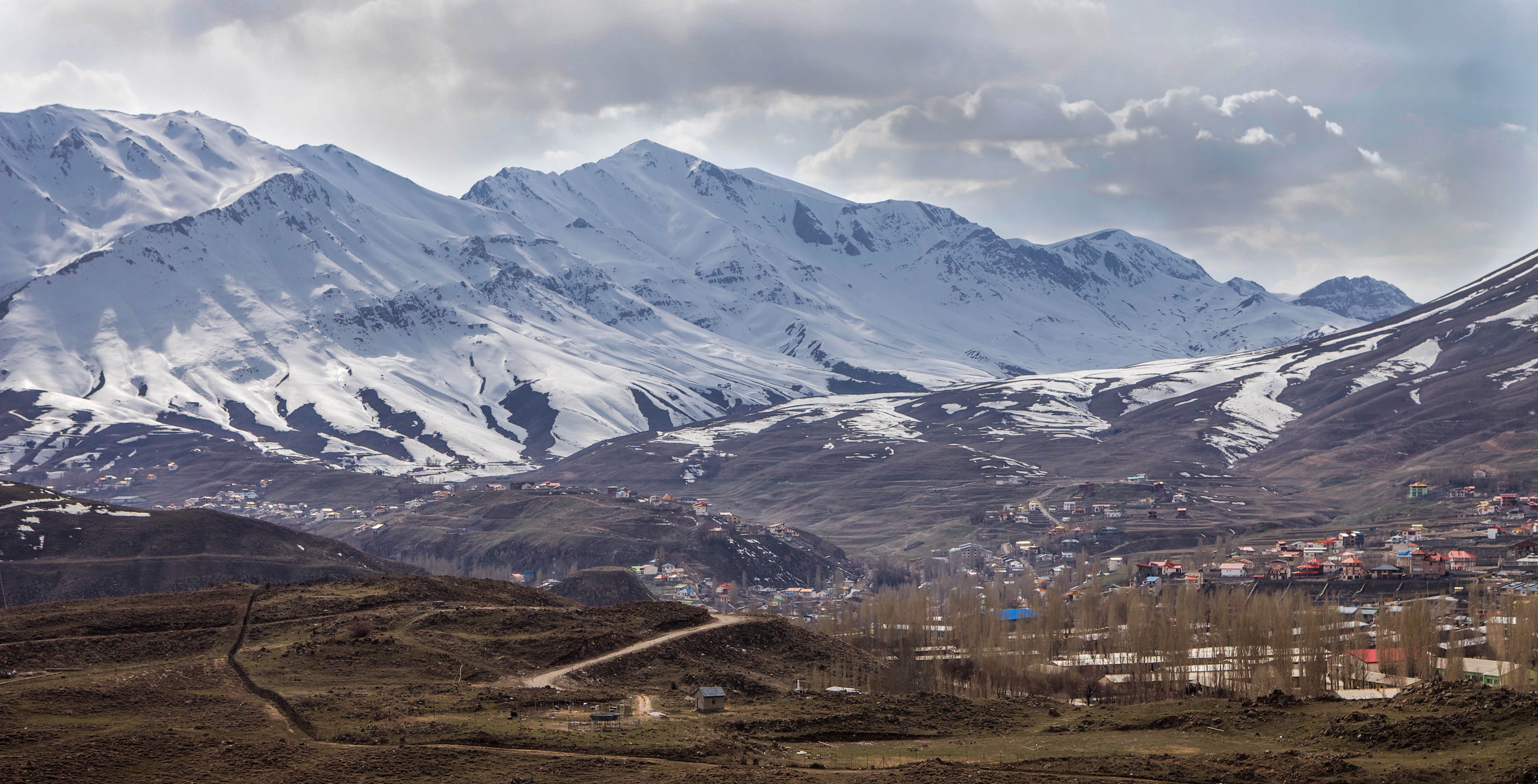
Haraz River Valley and Alborz range from Polur.

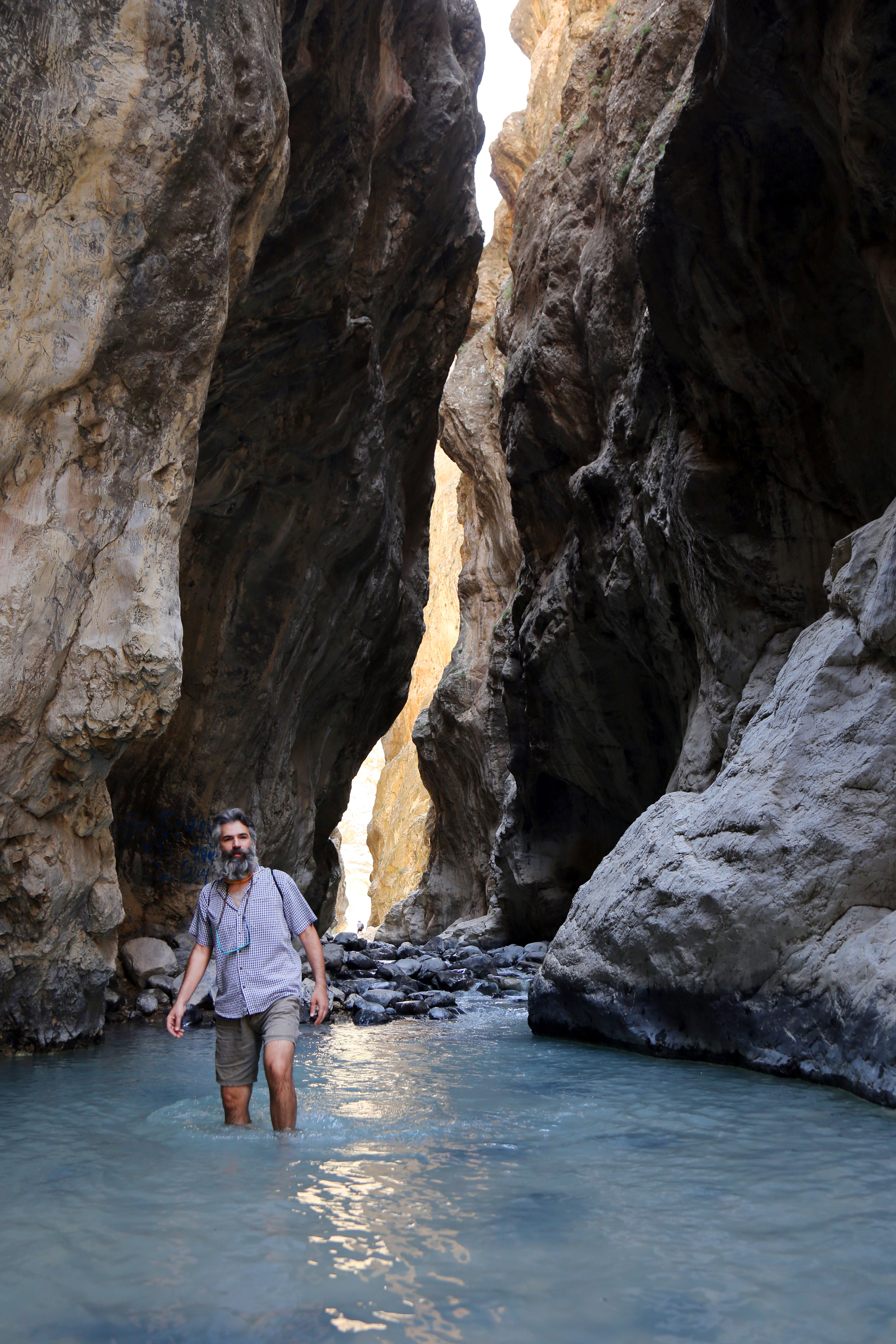
Zaman Valley, Mazandaran Province, Iran

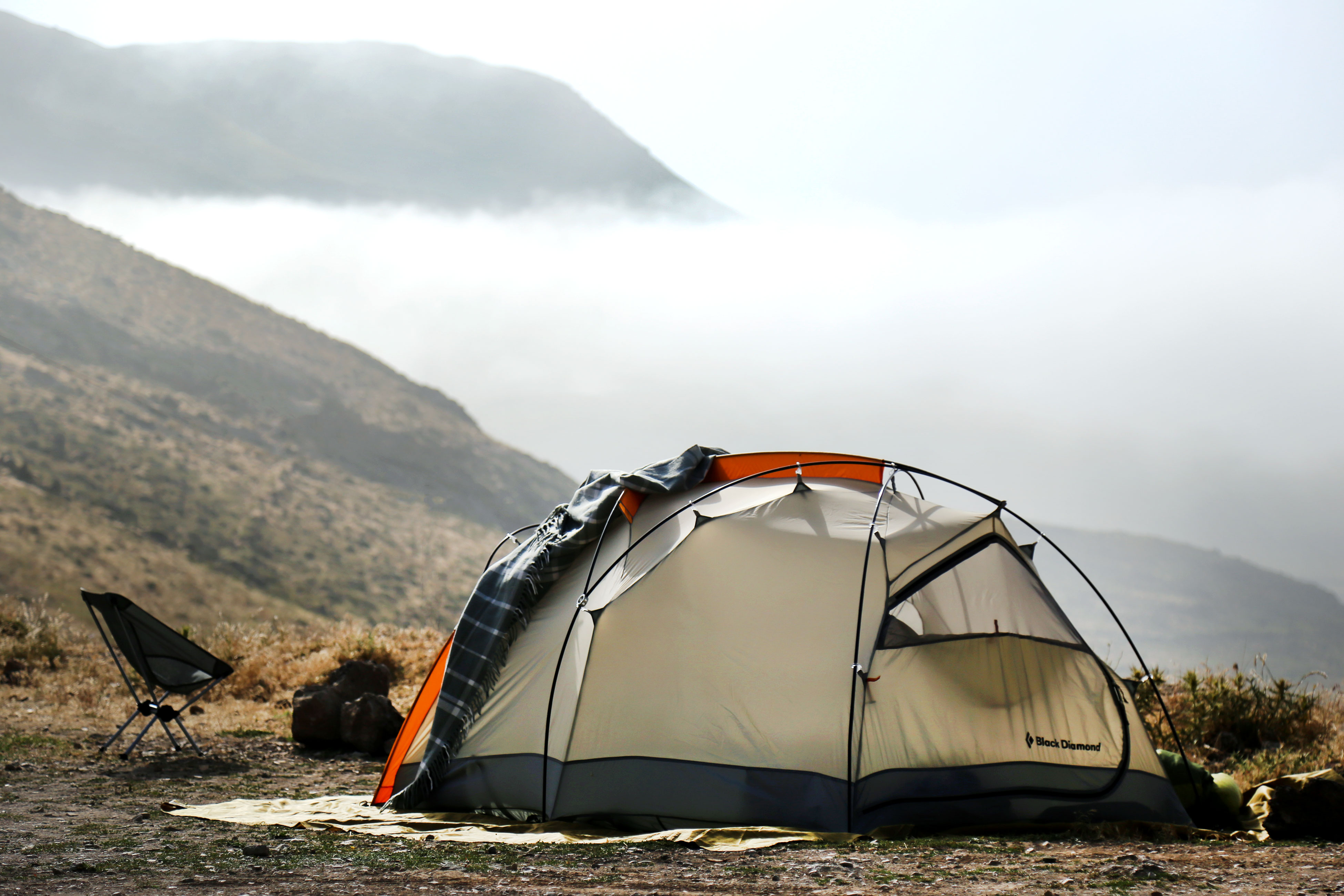
Lar National Park

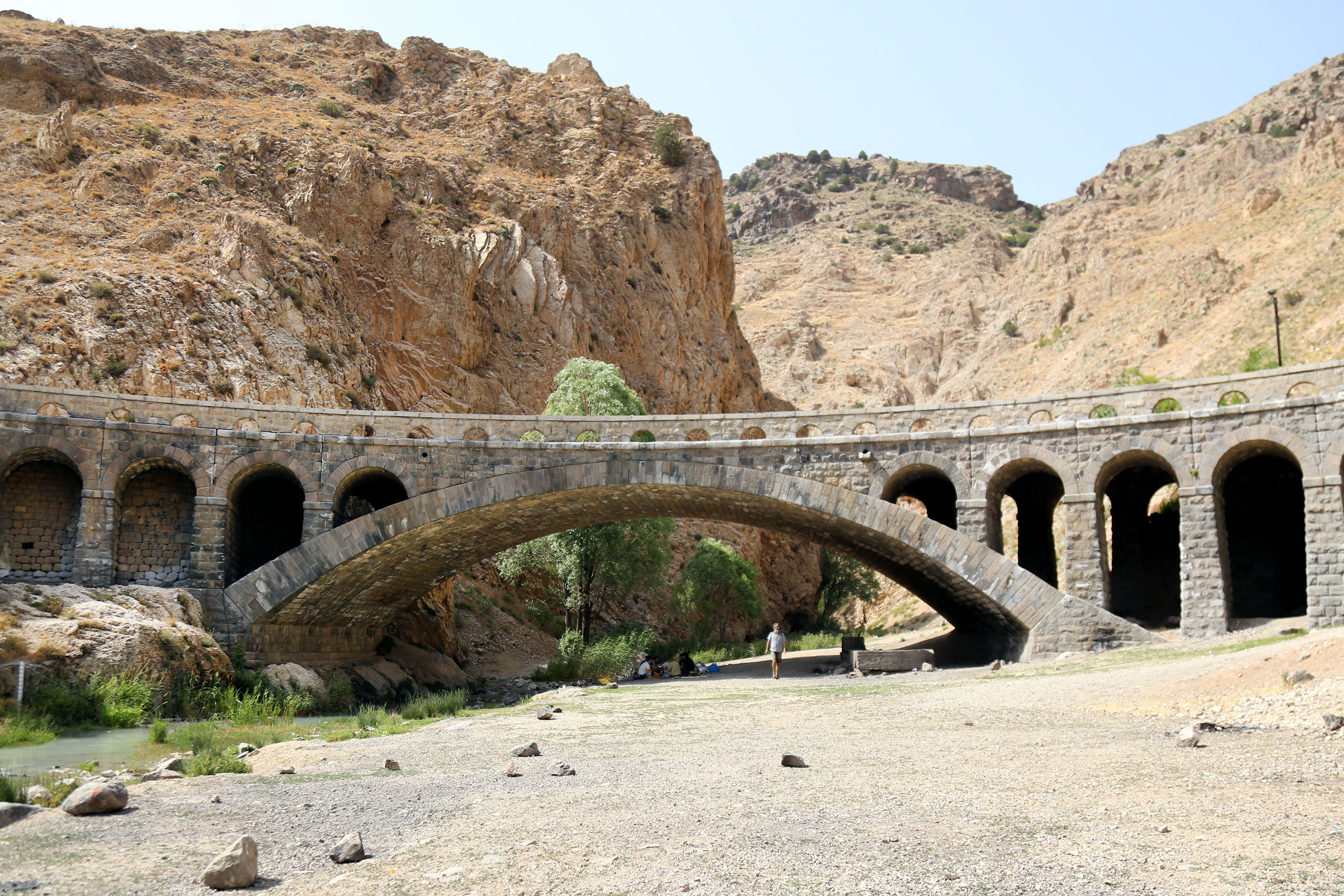
Shahi Bridge, Polour

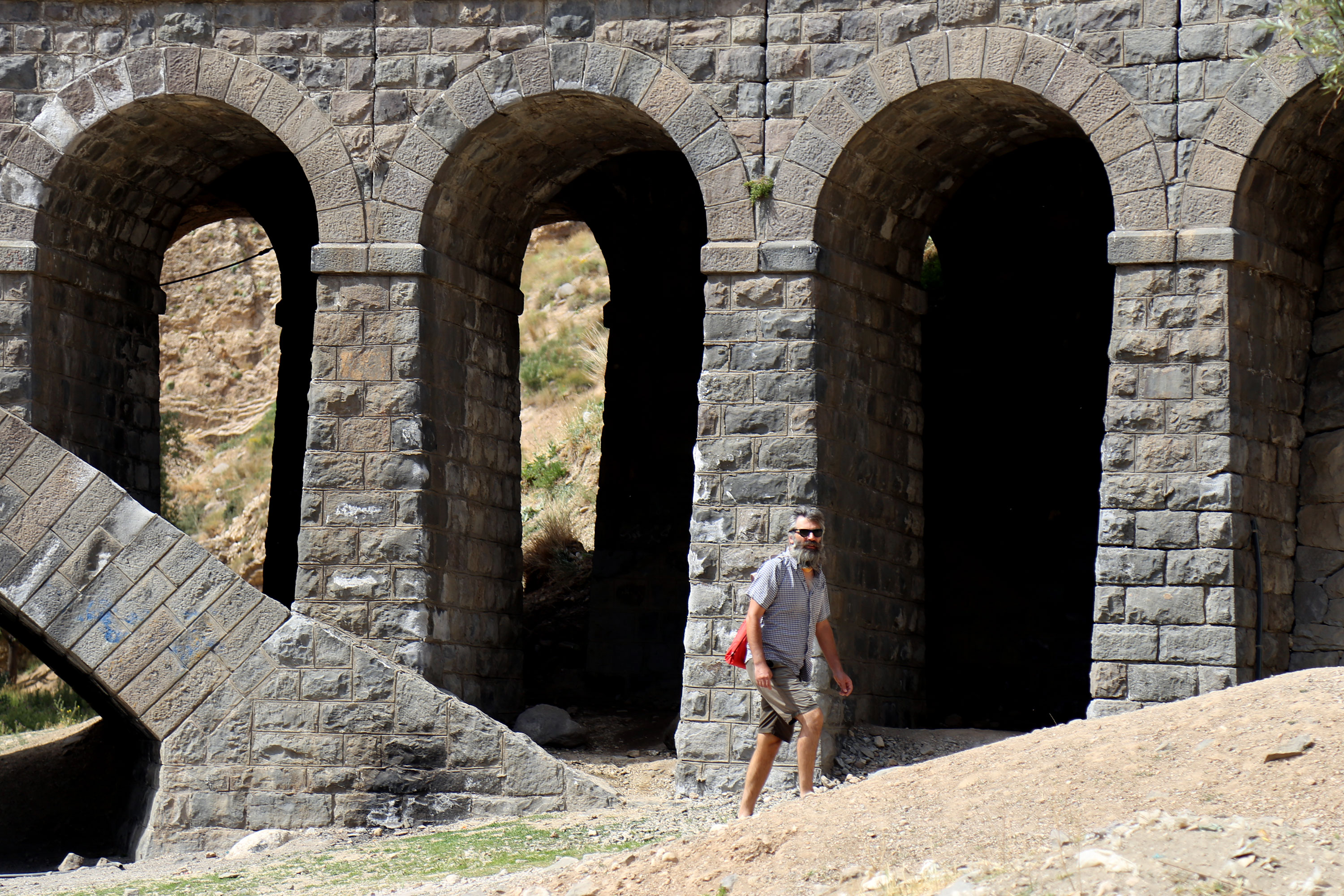
Shahi Bridge, Polour

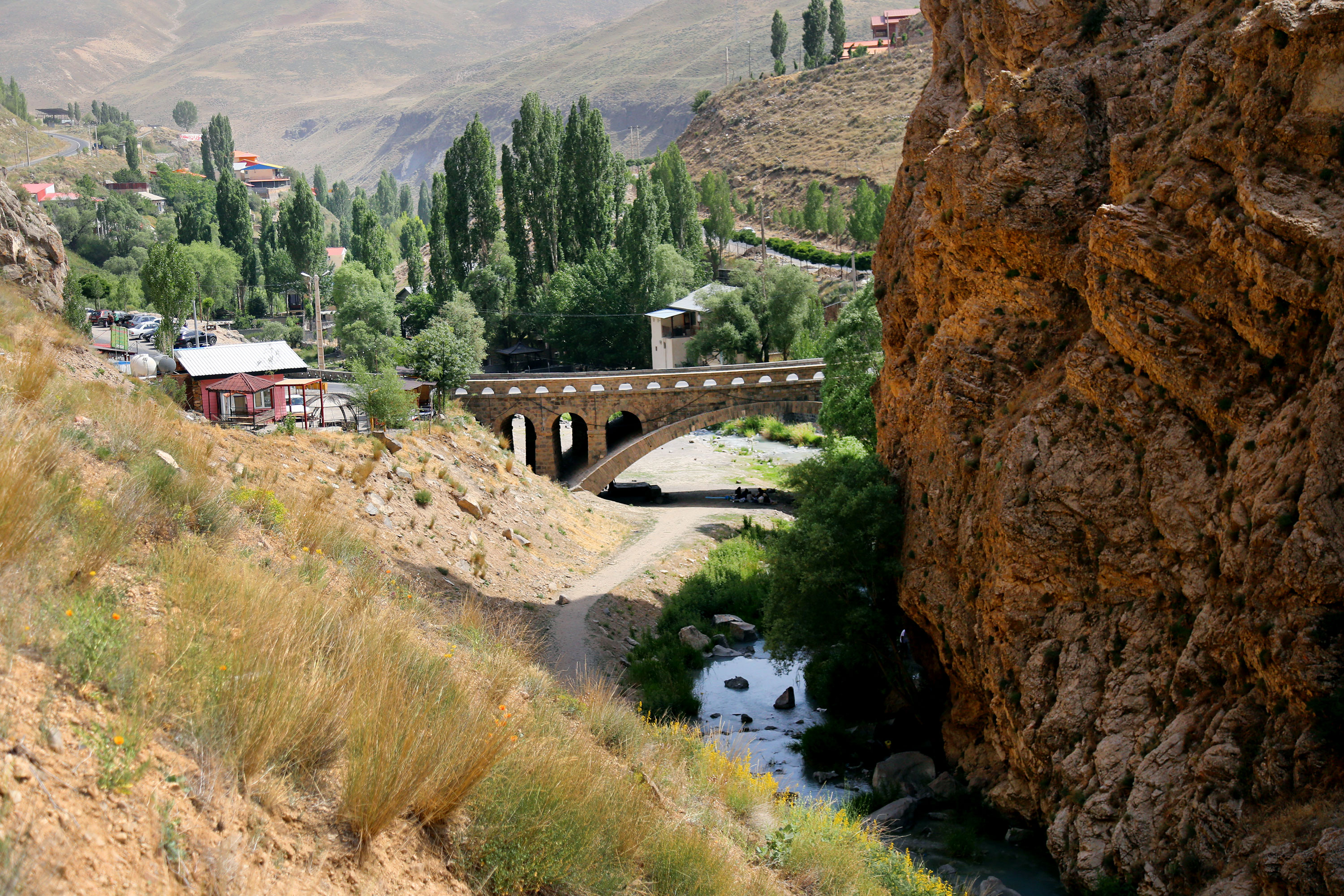
Shahi Bridge, Polour

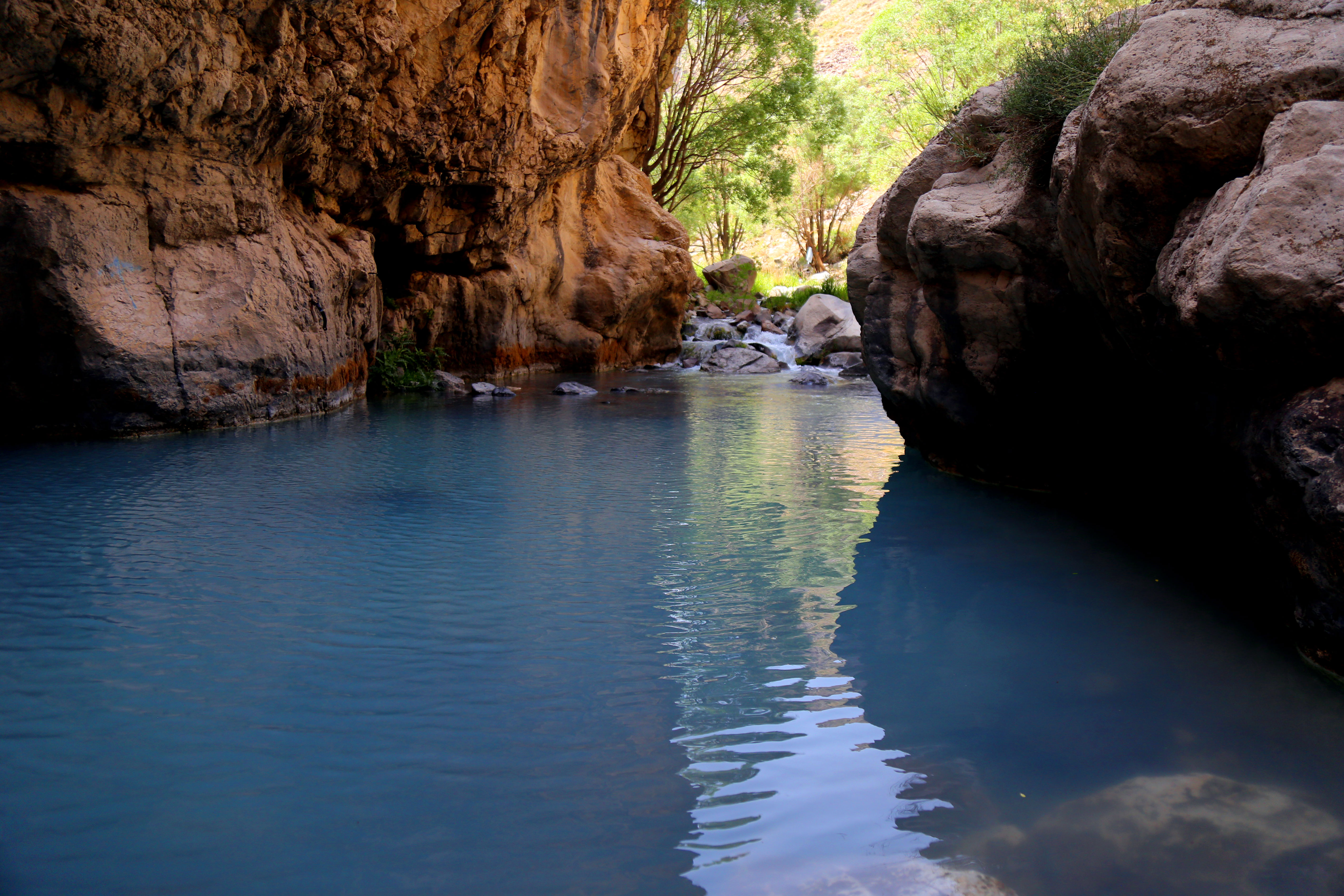
Zaman Valley, Mazandaran Province, Iran

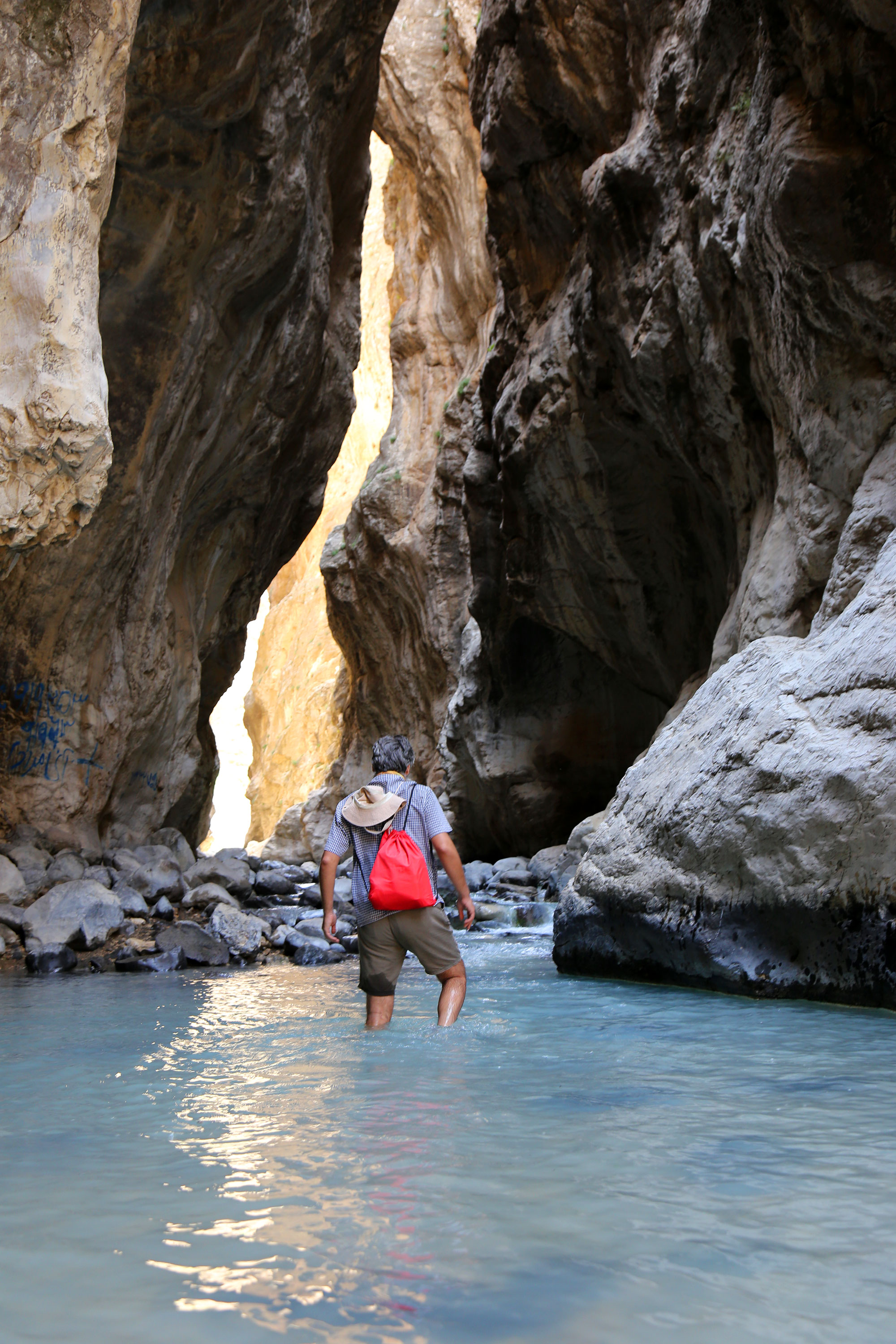
Zaman Valley, Mazandaran Province, Iran

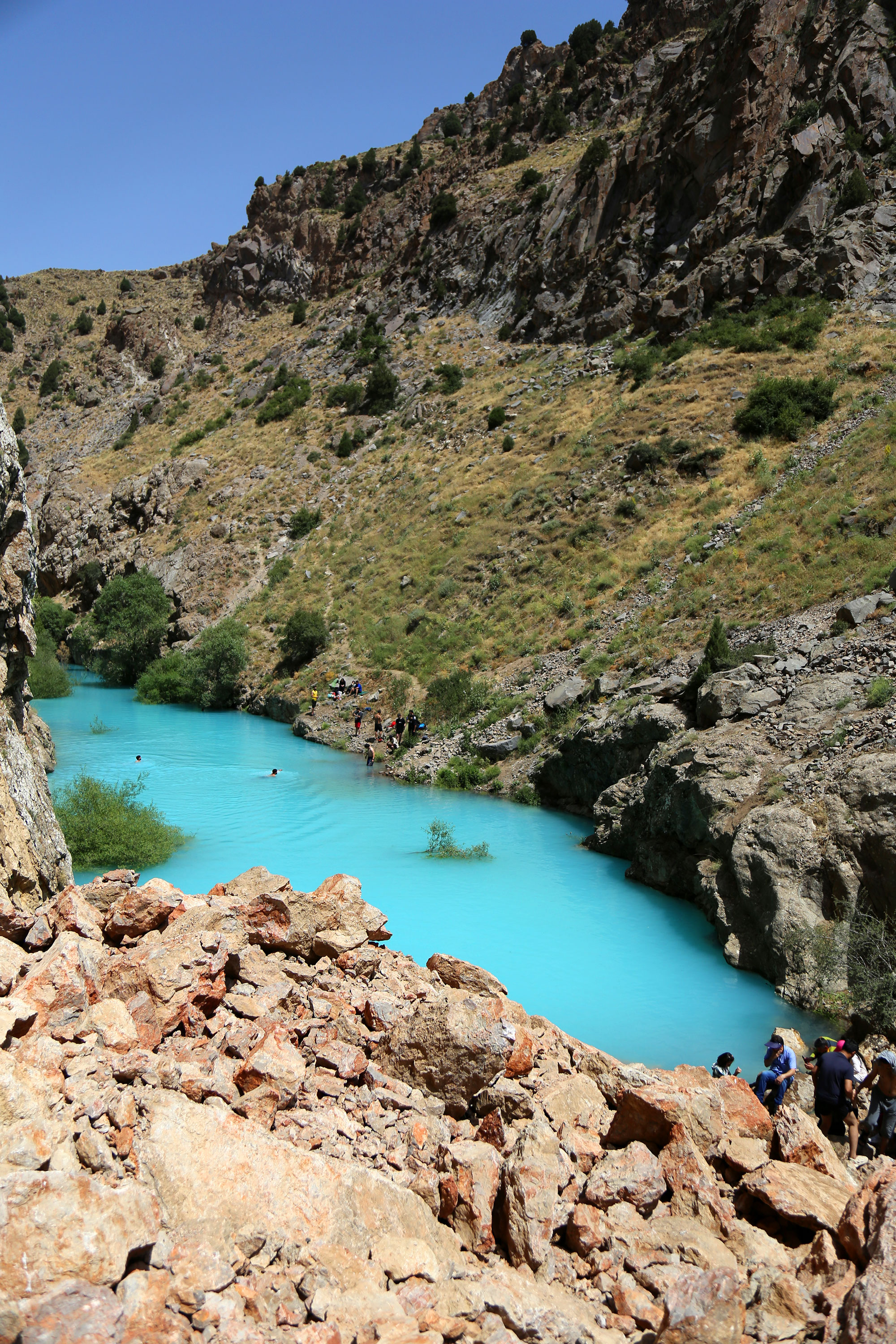
Firoozeh Water Basin

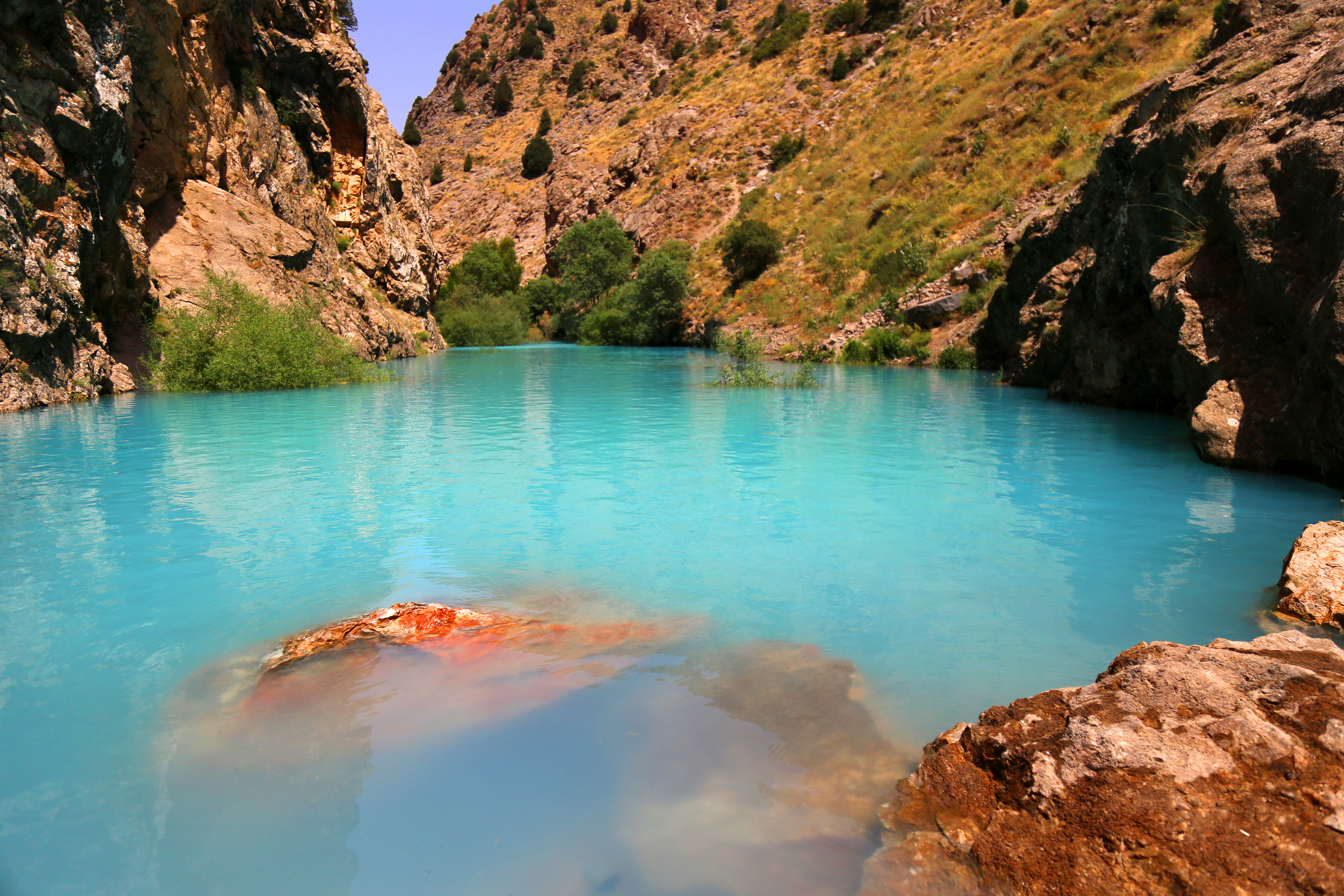
Firoozeh Water Basin, Zaman Valley, Mazandaran Province, Iran

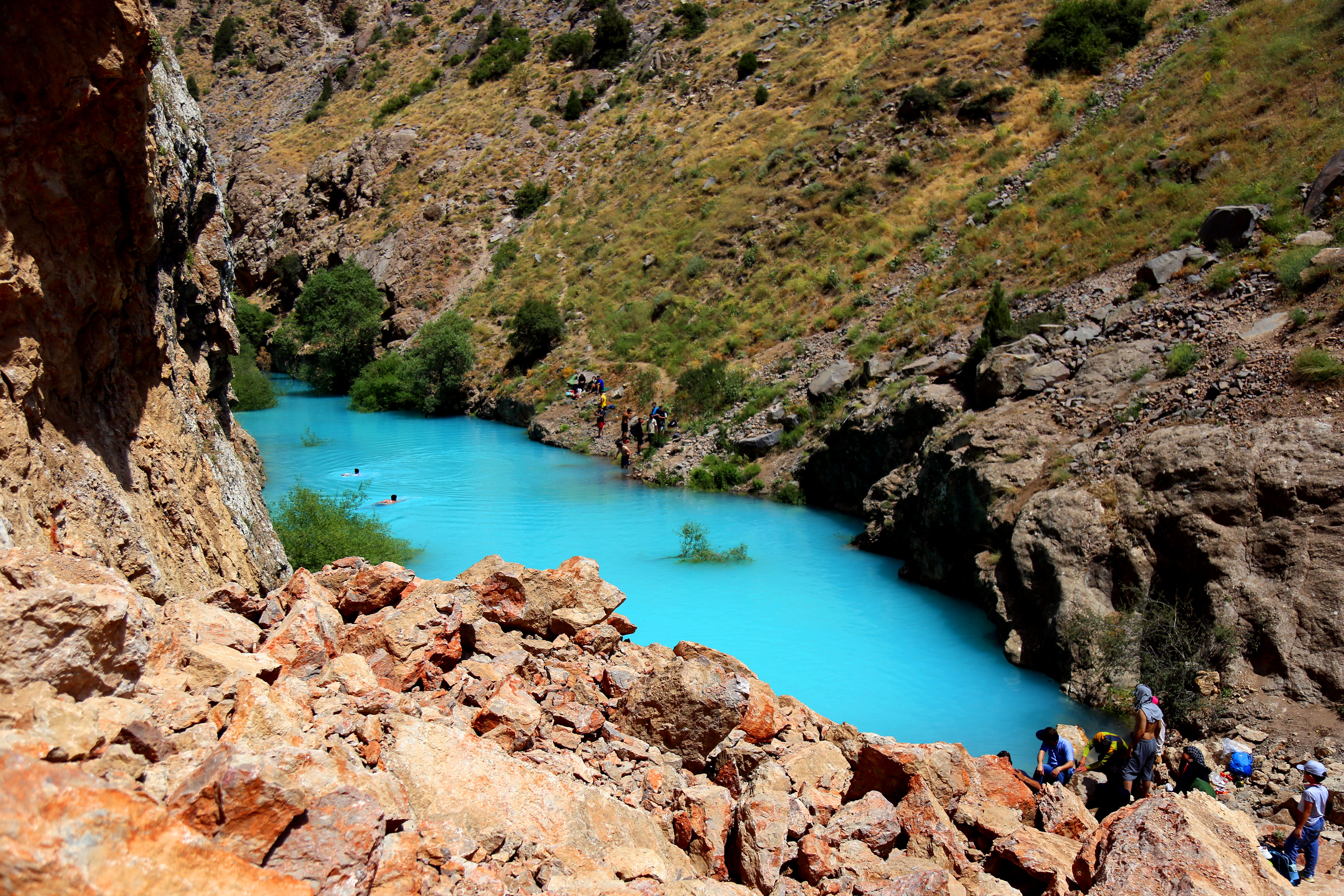
Firoozeh Water Basin, Zaman Valley, Mazandaran Province, Iran

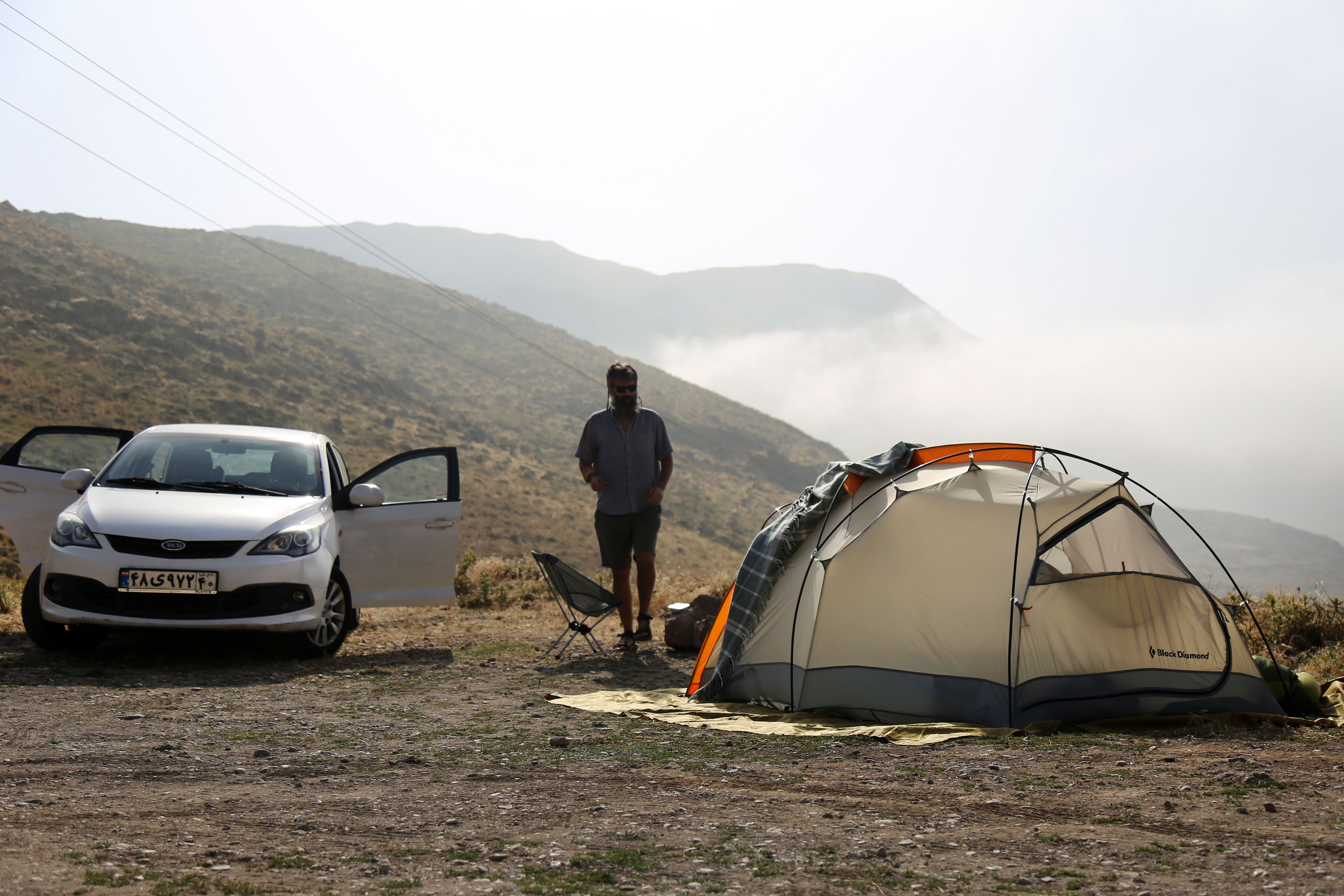
Lar National Park

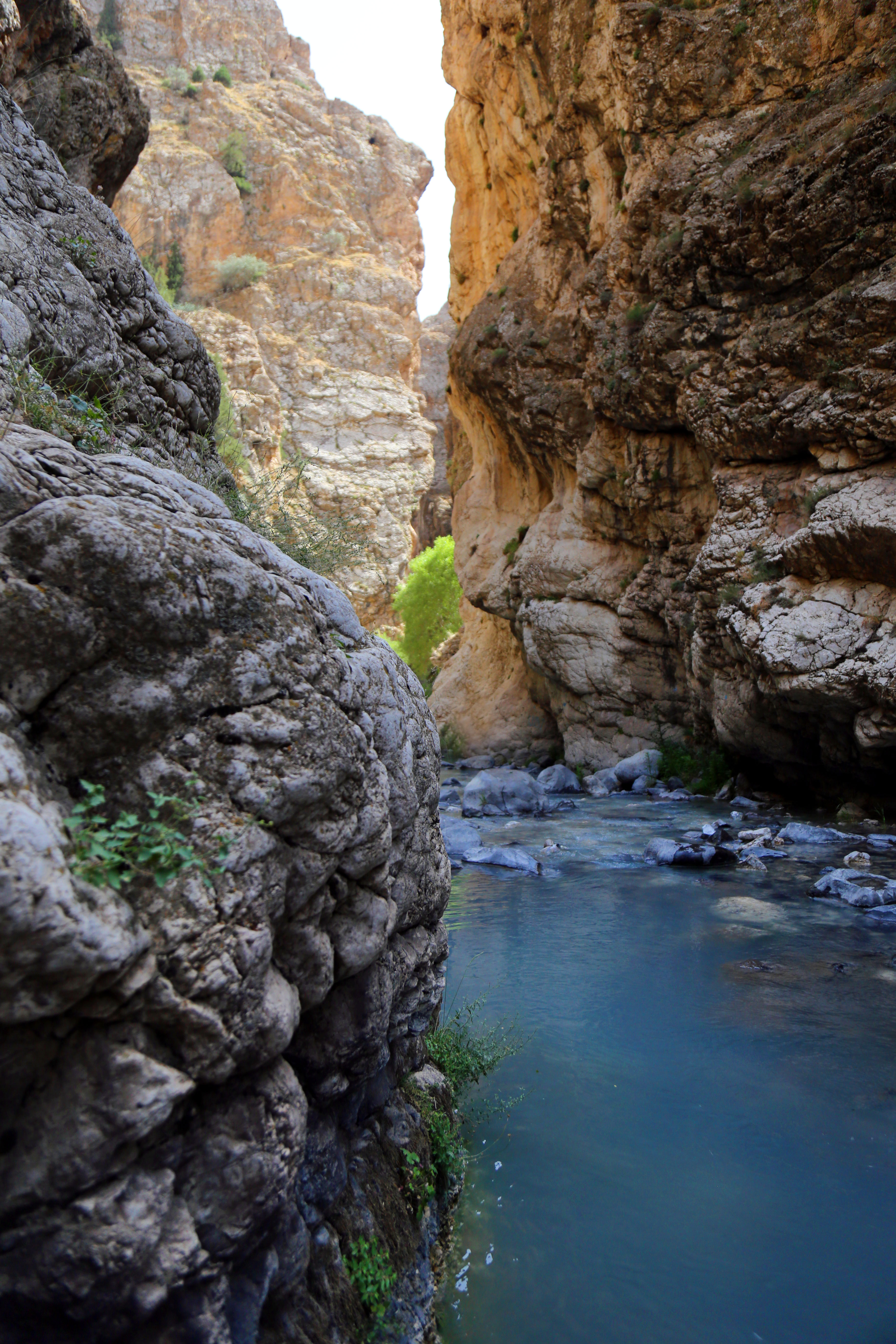
Zaman Valley, Mazandaran Province, Iran

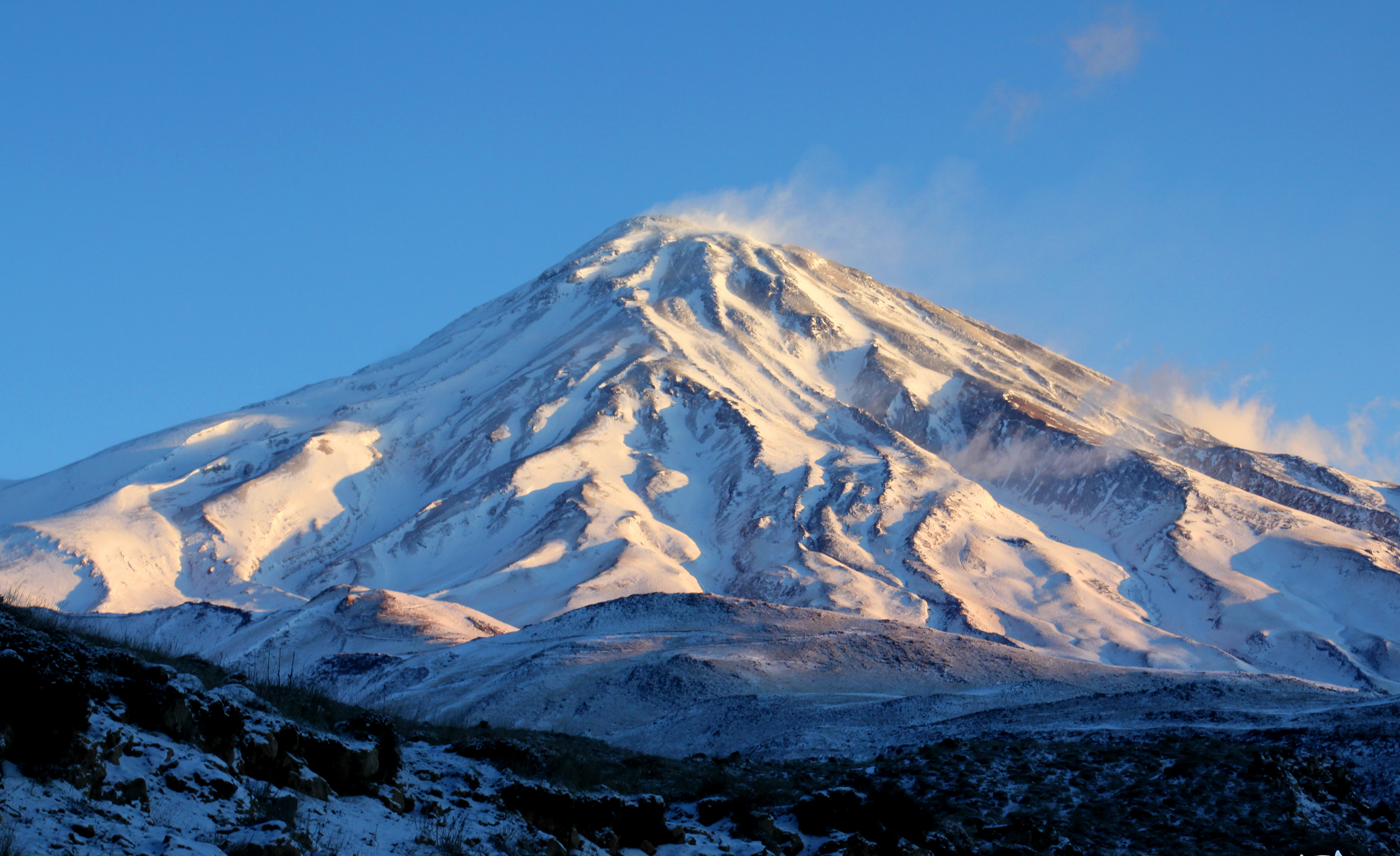
Mount Damavand

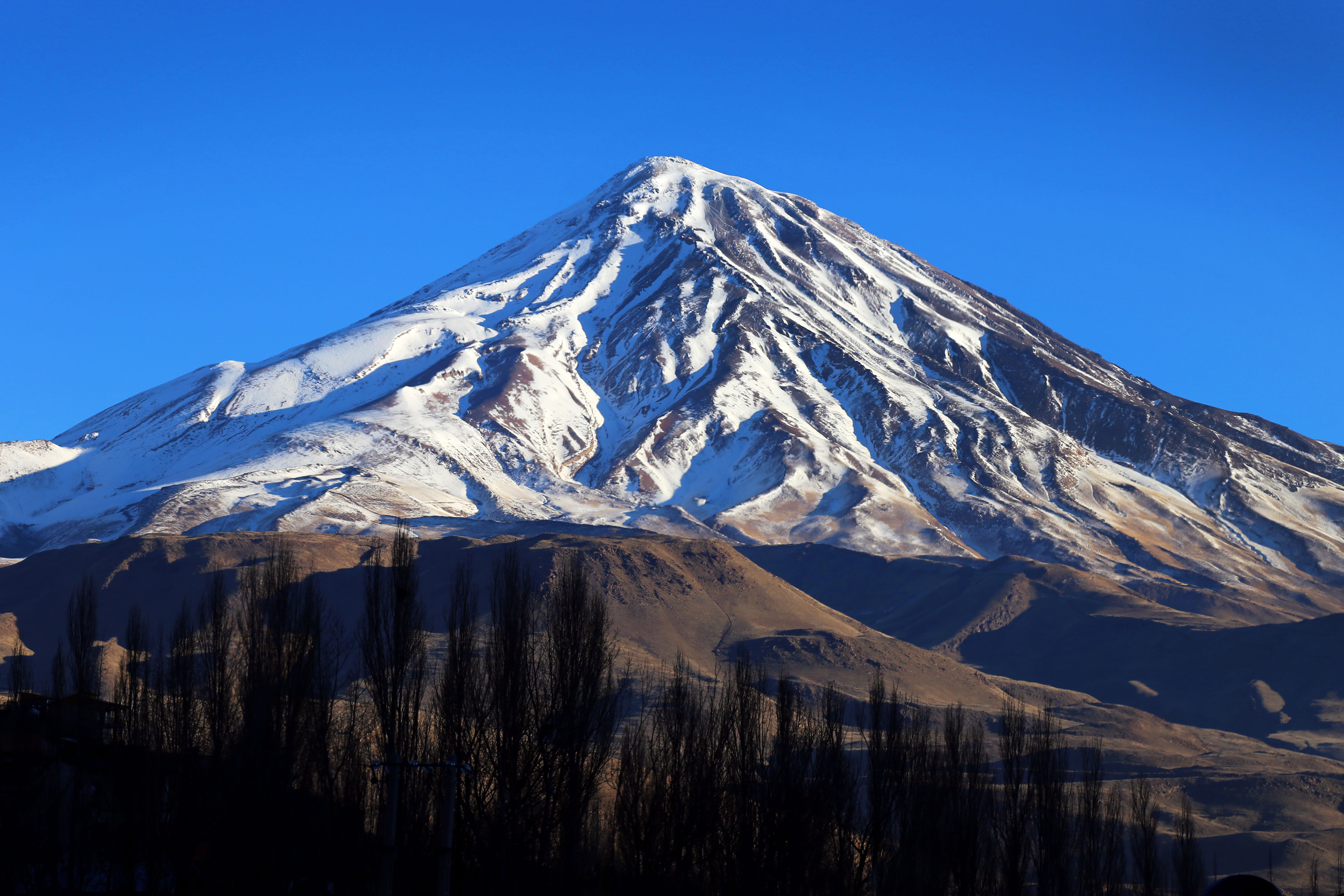
Mount Damavand

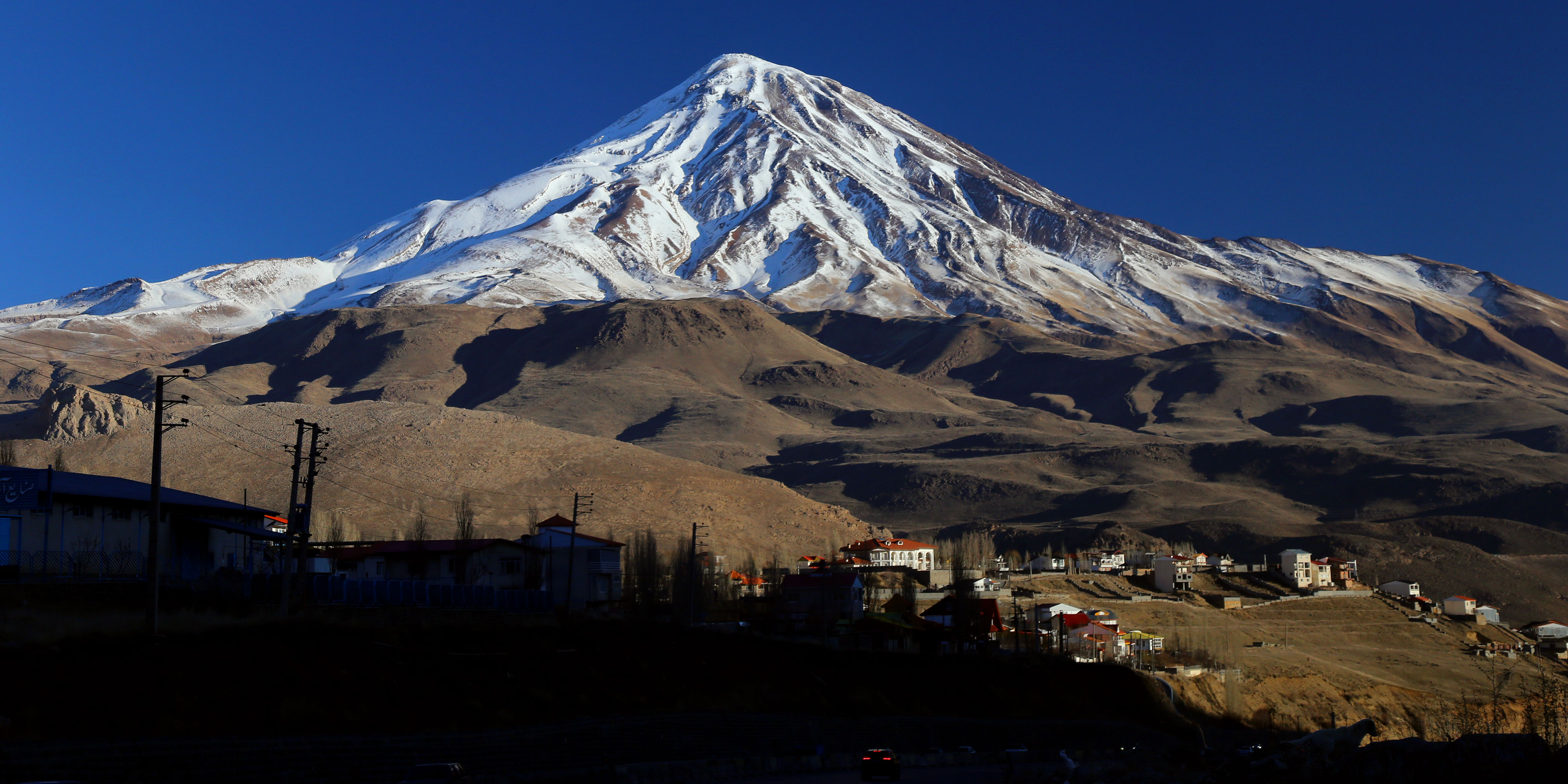
Mount Damavand

== See also ==
- Alborz (Elburz) mountain range topics
- Mountains of Iran

Media related to Polur, Iran at Wikimedia Commons
