= Do Hezar River =

River in Mazandaran, northern Iran

The Do Hezar River (Persian: رود دوهزار) is located in Mazandaran Province in northern Iran.

It flows northward through the Central Alborz mountain range, eventually combining with the Se Hezar River before flowing into the Caspian Sea as the Cheshmeh Kileh River.

== Central Alborz mountain range map ==
The Do Hezar River is #3 in the upper left corner of the map.

Map of central Alborz	Peaks:	1 Alam-Kuh
−25 to 500 m (−82 to 1,640 ft) 500 to 1,500 m (1,600 to 4,900 ft) 1,500 to 2,500 m (4,900 to 8,200 ft) 2,500 to 3,500 m (8,200 to 11,500 ft) 3,500 to 4,500 m (11,500 to 14,800 ft) 4,500 to 5,610 m (14,760 to 18,410 ft)	2 Azad Kuh	3 Damavand
−25 to 500 m (−82 to 1,640 ft) 500 to 1,500 m (1,600 to 4,900 ft) 1,500 to 2,500 m (4,900 to 8,200 ft) 2,500 to 3,500 m (8,200 to 11,500 ft) 3,500 to 4,500 m (11,500 to 14,800 ft) 4,500 to 5,610 m (14,760 to 18,410 ft)	4 Do Berar	5 Do Khaharan
−25 to 500 m (−82 to 1,640 ft) 500 to 1,500 m (1,600 to 4,900 ft) 1,500 to 2,500 m (4,900 to 8,200 ft) 2,500 to 3,500 m (8,200 to 11,500 ft) 3,500 to 4,500 m (11,500 to 14,800 ft) 4,500 to 5,610 m (14,760 to 18,410 ft)	6 Ghal'eh Gardan	7 Gorg
−25 to 500 m (−82 to 1,640 ft) 500 to 1,500 m (1,600 to 4,900 ft) 1,500 to 2,500 m (4,900 to 8,200 ft) 2,500 to 3,500 m (8,200 to 11,500 ft) 3,500 to 4,500 m (11,500 to 14,800 ft) 4,500 to 5,610 m (14,760 to 18,410 ft)	8 Kholeno	9 Mehr Chal
−25 to 500 m (−82 to 1,640 ft) 500 to 1,500 m (1,600 to 4,900 ft) 1,500 to 2,500 m (4,900 to 8,200 ft) 2,500 to 3,500 m (8,200 to 11,500 ft) 3,500 to 4,500 m (11,500 to 14,800 ft) 4,500 to 5,610 m (14,760 to 18,410 ft)	10 Mishineh Marg	11 Naz
−25 to 500 m (−82 to 1,640 ft) 500 to 1,500 m (1,600 to 4,900 ft) 1,500 to 2,500 m (4,900 to 8,200 ft) 2,500 to 3,500 m (8,200 to 11,500 ft) 3,500 to 4,500 m (11,500 to 14,800 ft) 4,500 to 5,610 m (14,760 to 18,410 ft)	12 Shah Alborz	13 Sialan
−25 to 500 m (−82 to 1,640 ft) 500 to 1,500 m (1,600 to 4,900 ft) 1,500 to 2,500 m (4,900 to 8,200 ft) 2,500 to 3,500 m (8,200 to 11,500 ft) 3,500 to 4,500 m (11,500 to 14,800 ft) 4,500 to 5,610 m (14,760 to 18,410 ft)	14 Tochal	15 Varavašt
−25 to 500 m (−82 to 1,640 ft) 500 to 1,500 m (1,600 to 4,900 ft) 1,500 to 2,500 m (4,900 to 8,200 ft) 2,500 to 3,500 m (8,200 to 11,500 ft) 3,500 to 4,500 m (11,500 to 14,800 ft) 4,500 to 5,610 m (14,760 to 18,410 ft)	Rivers:	0
−25 to 500 m (−82 to 1,640 ft) 500 to 1,500 m (1,600 to 4,900 ft) 1,500 to 2,500 m (4,900 to 8,200 ft) 2,500 to 3,500 m (8,200 to 11,500 ft) 3,500 to 4,500 m (11,500 to 14,800 ft) 4,500 to 5,610 m (14,760 to 18,410 ft)	1 Alamut	2 Chalus
−25 to 500 m (−82 to 1,640 ft) 500 to 1,500 m (1,600 to 4,900 ft) 1,500 to 2,500 m (4,900 to 8,200 ft) 2,500 to 3,500 m (8,200 to 11,500 ft) 3,500 to 4,500 m (11,500 to 14,800 ft) 4,500 to 5,610 m (14,760 to 18,410 ft)	3 Do Hezar	4 Haraz
−25 to 500 m (−82 to 1,640 ft) 500 to 1,500 m (1,600 to 4,900 ft) 1,500 to 2,500 m (4,900 to 8,200 ft) 2,500 to 3,500 m (8,200 to 11,500 ft) 3,500 to 4,500 m (11,500 to 14,800 ft) 4,500 to 5,610 m (14,760 to 18,410 ft)	5 Jajrood	6 Karaj
−25 to 500 m (−82 to 1,640 ft) 500 to 1,500 m (1,600 to 4,900 ft) 1,500 to 2,500 m (4,900 to 8,200 ft) 2,500 to 3,500 m (8,200 to 11,500 ft) 3,500 to 4,500 m (11,500 to 14,800 ft) 4,500 to 5,610 m (14,760 to 18,410 ft)	7 Kojoor	8 Lar
−25 to 500 m (−82 to 1,640 ft) 500 to 1,500 m (1,600 to 4,900 ft) 1,500 to 2,500 m (4,900 to 8,200 ft) 2,500 to 3,500 m (8,200 to 11,500 ft) 3,500 to 4,500 m (11,500 to 14,800 ft) 4,500 to 5,610 m (14,760 to 18,410 ft)	9 Noor	10 Sardab
−25 to 500 m (−82 to 1,640 ft) 500 to 1,500 m (1,600 to 4,900 ft) 1,500 to 2,500 m (4,900 to 8,200 ft) 2,500 to 3,500 m (8,200 to 11,500 ft) 3,500 to 4,500 m (11,500 to 14,800 ft) 4,500 to 5,610 m (14,760 to 18,410 ft)	11 Seh Hazar	12 Shahrood
−25 to 500 m (−82 to 1,640 ft) 500 to 1,500 m (1,600 to 4,900 ft) 1,500 to 2,500 m (4,900 to 8,200 ft) 2,500 to 3,500 m (8,200 to 11,500 ft) 3,500 to 4,500 m (11,500 to 14,800 ft) 4,500 to 5,610 m (14,760 to 18,410 ft)	Cities:	1 Amol
−25 to 500 m (−82 to 1,640 ft) 500 to 1,500 m (1,600 to 4,900 ft) 1,500 to 2,500 m (4,900 to 8,200 ft) 2,500 to 3,500 m (8,200 to 11,500 ft) 3,500 to 4,500 m (11,500 to 14,800 ft) 4,500 to 5,610 m (14,760 to 18,410 ft)	2 Chalus	3 Karaj
−25 to 500 m (−82 to 1,640 ft) 500 to 1,500 m (1,600 to 4,900 ft) 1,500 to 2,500 m (4,900 to 8,200 ft) 2,500 to 3,500 m (8,200 to 11,500 ft) 3,500 to 4,500 m (11,500 to 14,800 ft) 4,500 to 5,610 m (14,760 to 18,410 ft)	Other:	D Dizin
−25 to 500 m (−82 to 1,640 ft) 500 to 1,500 m (1,600 to 4,900 ft) 1,500 to 2,500 m (4,900 to 8,200 ft) 2,500 to 3,500 m (8,200 to 11,500 ft) 3,500 to 4,500 m (11,500 to 14,800 ft) 4,500 to 5,610 m (14,760 to 18,410 ft)	E Emamzadeh Hashem	K Kandovan Tunnel
−25 to 500 m (−82 to 1,640 ft) 500 to 1,500 m (1,600 to 4,900 ft) 1,500 to 2,500 m (4,900 to 8,200 ft) 2,500 to 3,500 m (8,200 to 11,500 ft) 3,500 to 4,500 m (11,500 to 14,800 ft) 4,500 to 5,610 m (14,760 to 18,410 ft)	* Latyan Dam	** Lar Dam
