= Abshar Dogholu =

Waterfall in Tehran, Iran

Coordinates: 35.854806°N 51.428944°E

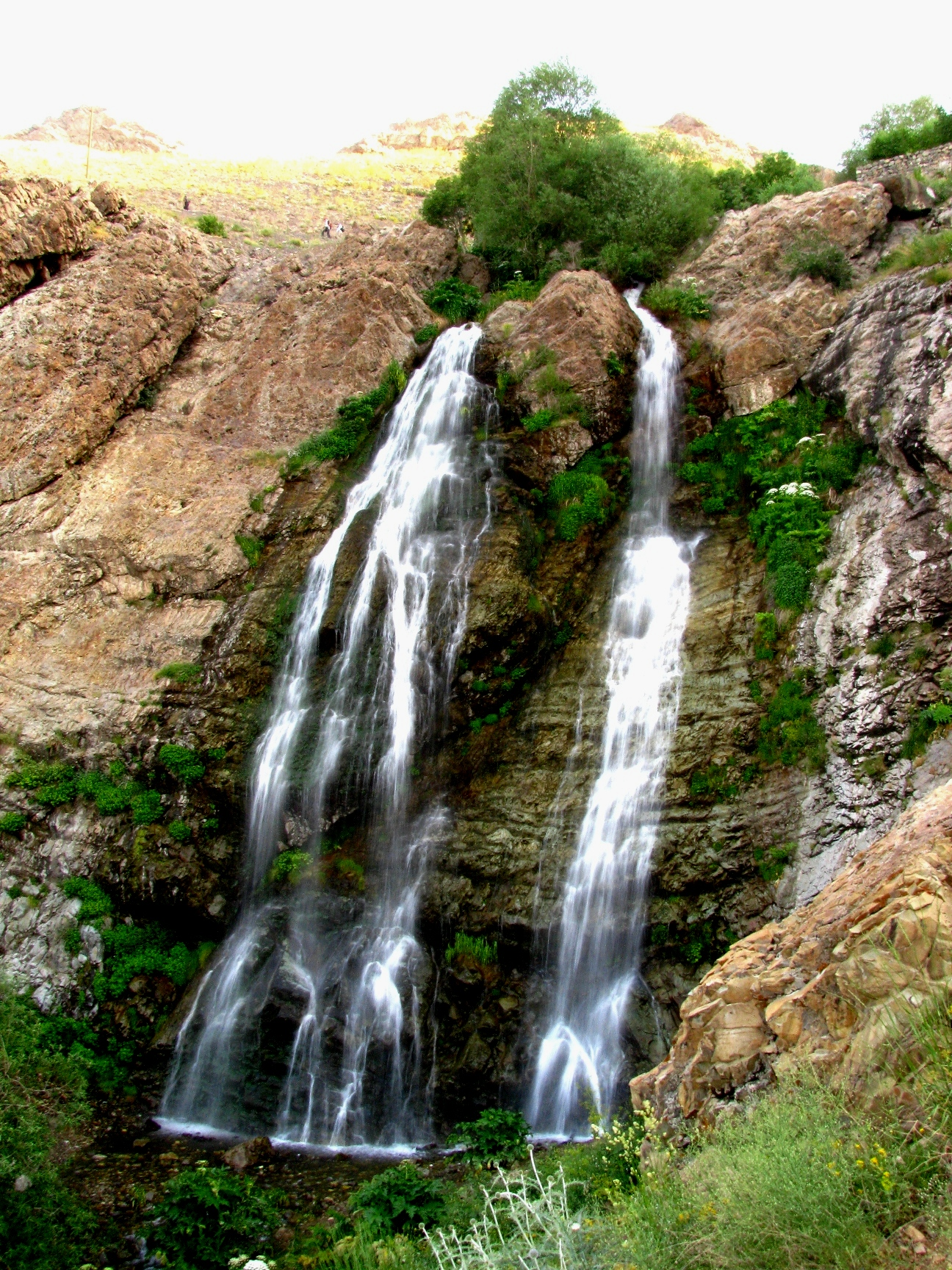
Abshar Dogholu in July

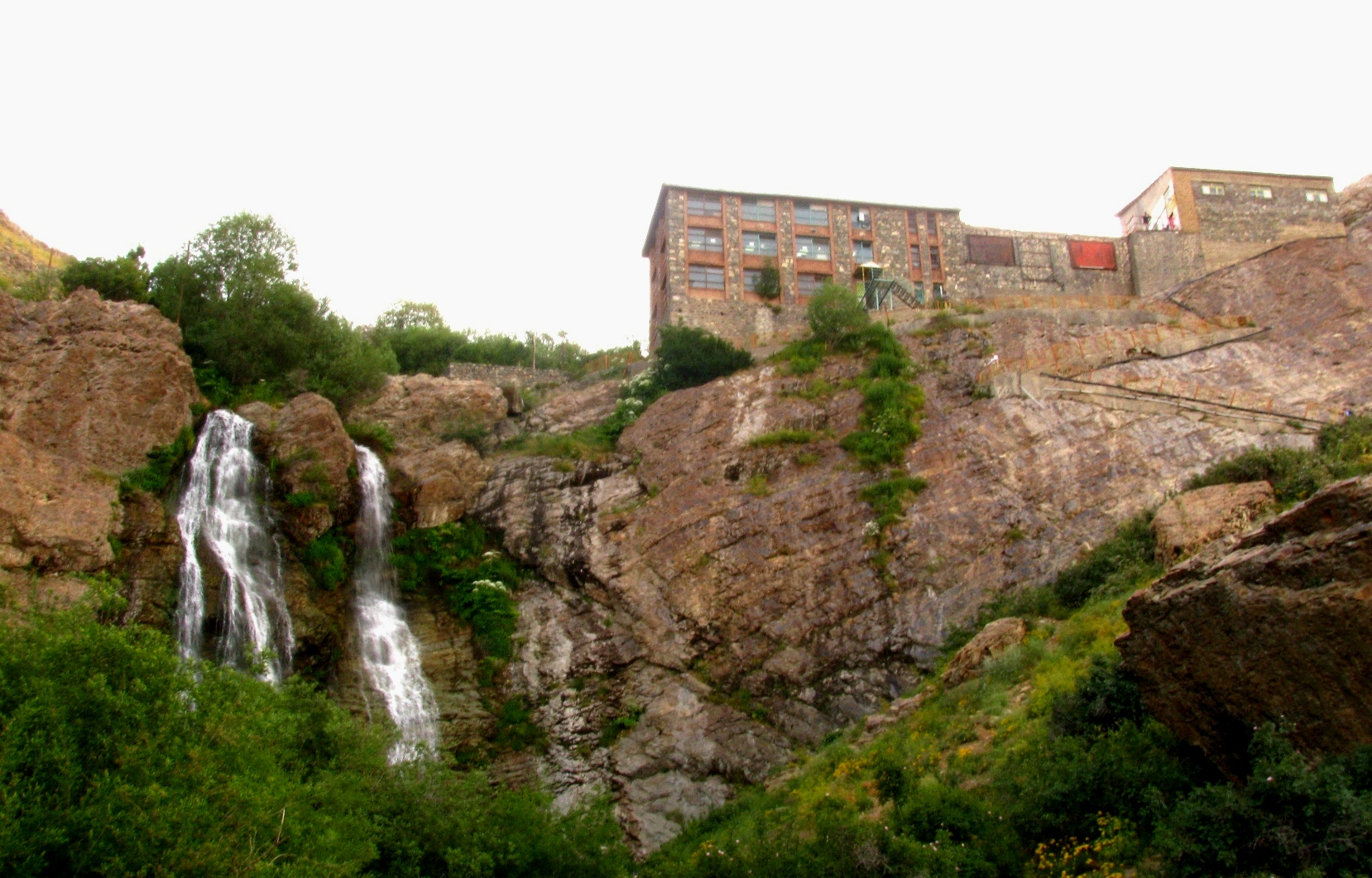
Abshar Dogholu (Twin Falls) and Shirpalā Shelter

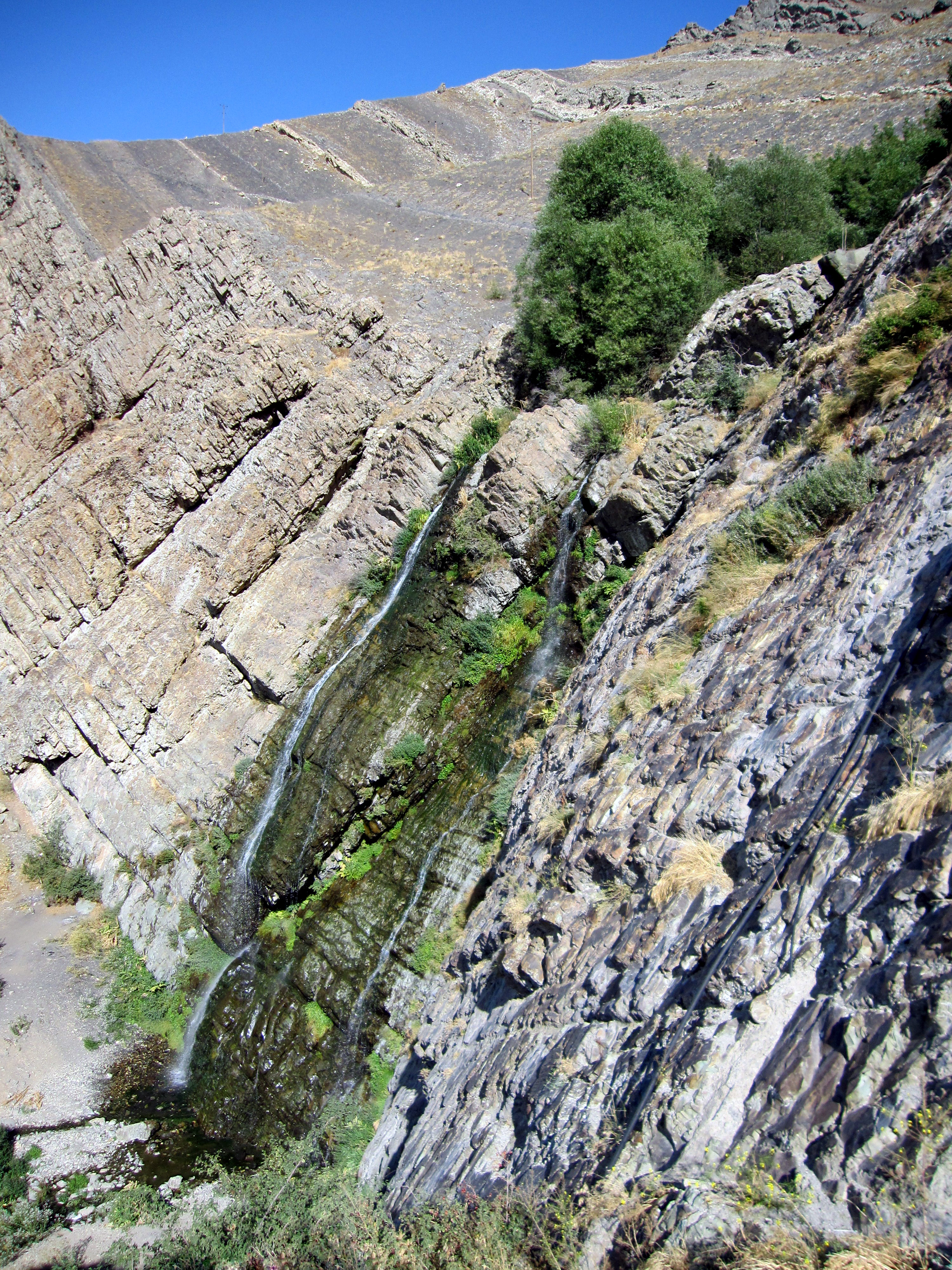
Abshar Dogholu in September

Abshar Dogholu or Dogholu Waterfalls (Persian: آبشار دوقلو, lit. Twin Falls), is the waterfall in the northern part of Tehran, Iran, and is located near Shirpala shelter positioned in the south face of mount Tochal in the Alborz mountains.

Abshar Dogholu is situated at the elevation of nearly 2750 meters above sea level and is accessible via a route passing through Sarband, Pas-Ghaleh to Shirpala shelter. It literally means Twin Falls and that is because of its natural shape of flowing over the cliff which divides to two separate branches where falling down. The headwaters of the stream is the melting ice and snow on mount Tochal

== Kamal-ol-molk painting of the falls ==
The Iranian painter Kamal-ol-molk drew the Abshar Dogholu in the 19th century.

== See also ==
- Shirpala shelter
- Sangan Waterfall
- Yakhi Waterfall
