= Shirpala shelter =

Coordinates: 35.8550°N 51.4294°E

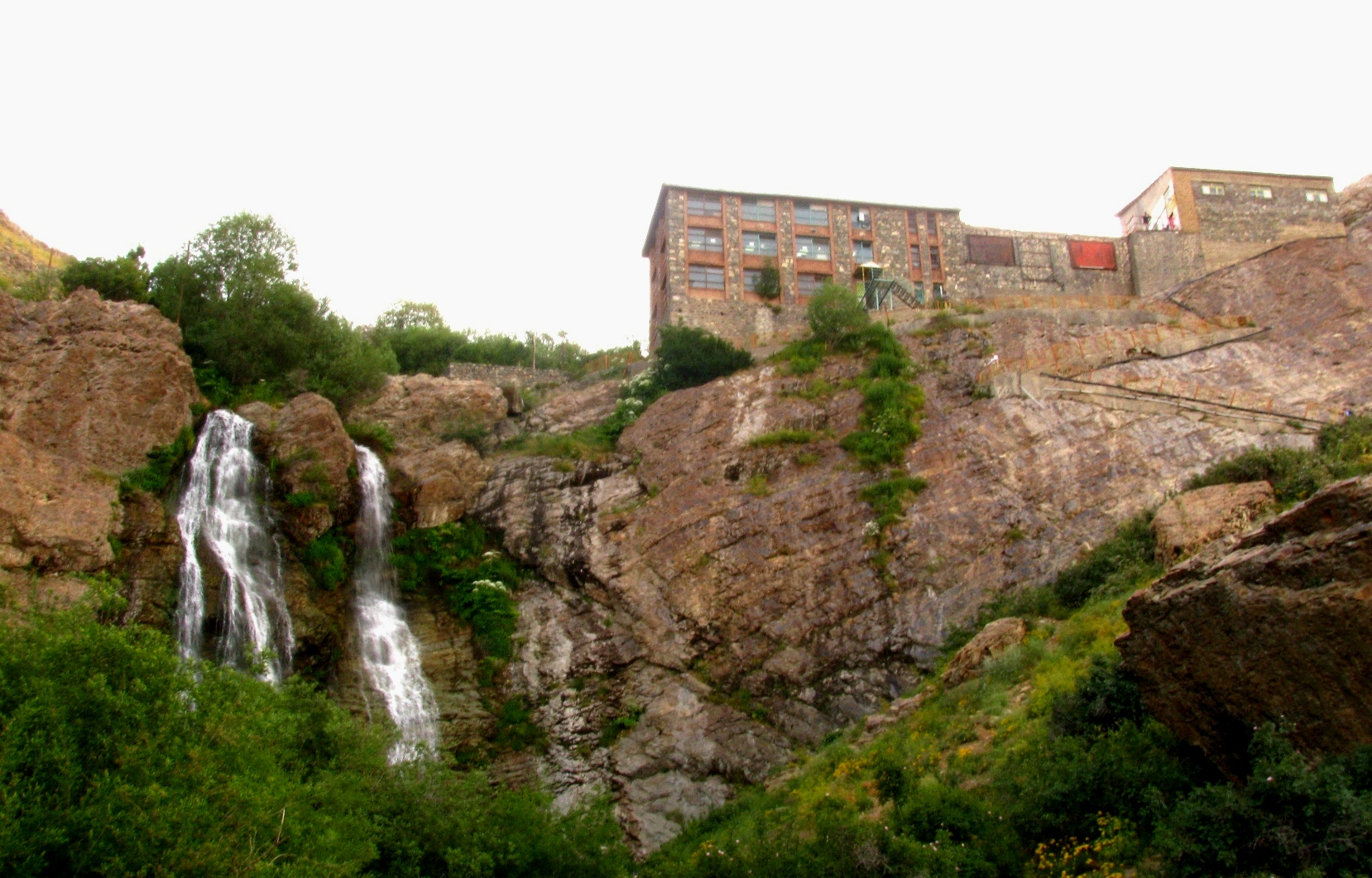
Shirpalā Shelter and Abshar Dogholu (Twin Falls)

Shirpala shelter is a mountain shelter positioned in Alborz mountains, north of metropolitan Tehran, Iran.

It is situated at the elevation of 2750 meters above sea level and is accessible via a route passing through Sarband, Pas-Ghaleh and Abshar Dogholu. It usually takes 3 to 4 hours to ascend to mount Tochal from this shelter. This shelter was made by Iranian Mountain Climbing Federation with the help of Iranian Boy Scout Association.

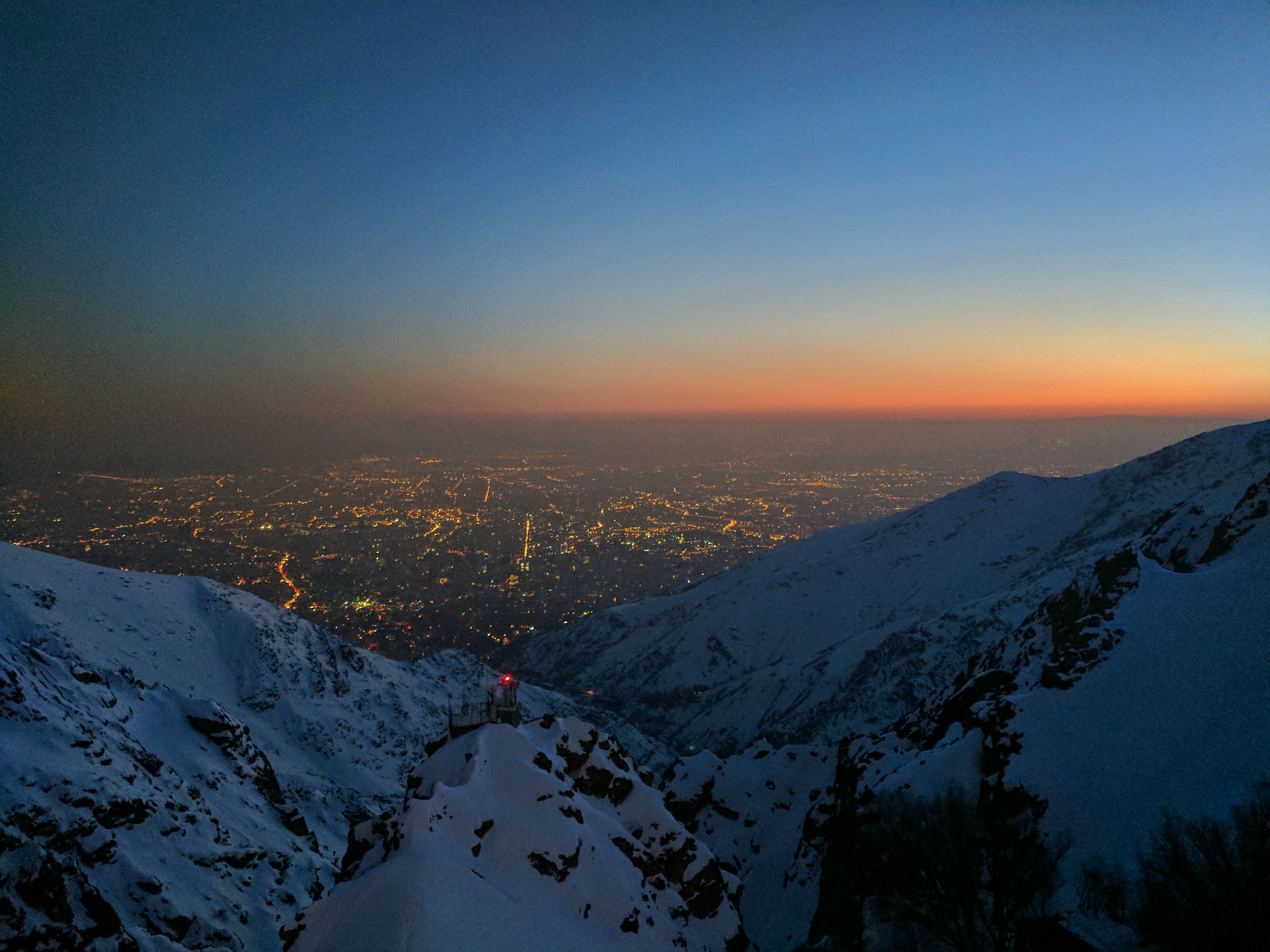
Shirpala's southern view at sunset

== Folklore ==
It is believed that Kai Kobad, mythical Iranian king had lived in a fort located in Shirpala before ascending to the throne with the help of Rostam another Iranian mythical figure.

== See also ==
- Abshar Dogholu
