= Yakhi Waterfall =

Waterfall in Amol, Iran

Coordinates: 35.9406°N 52.1217°E

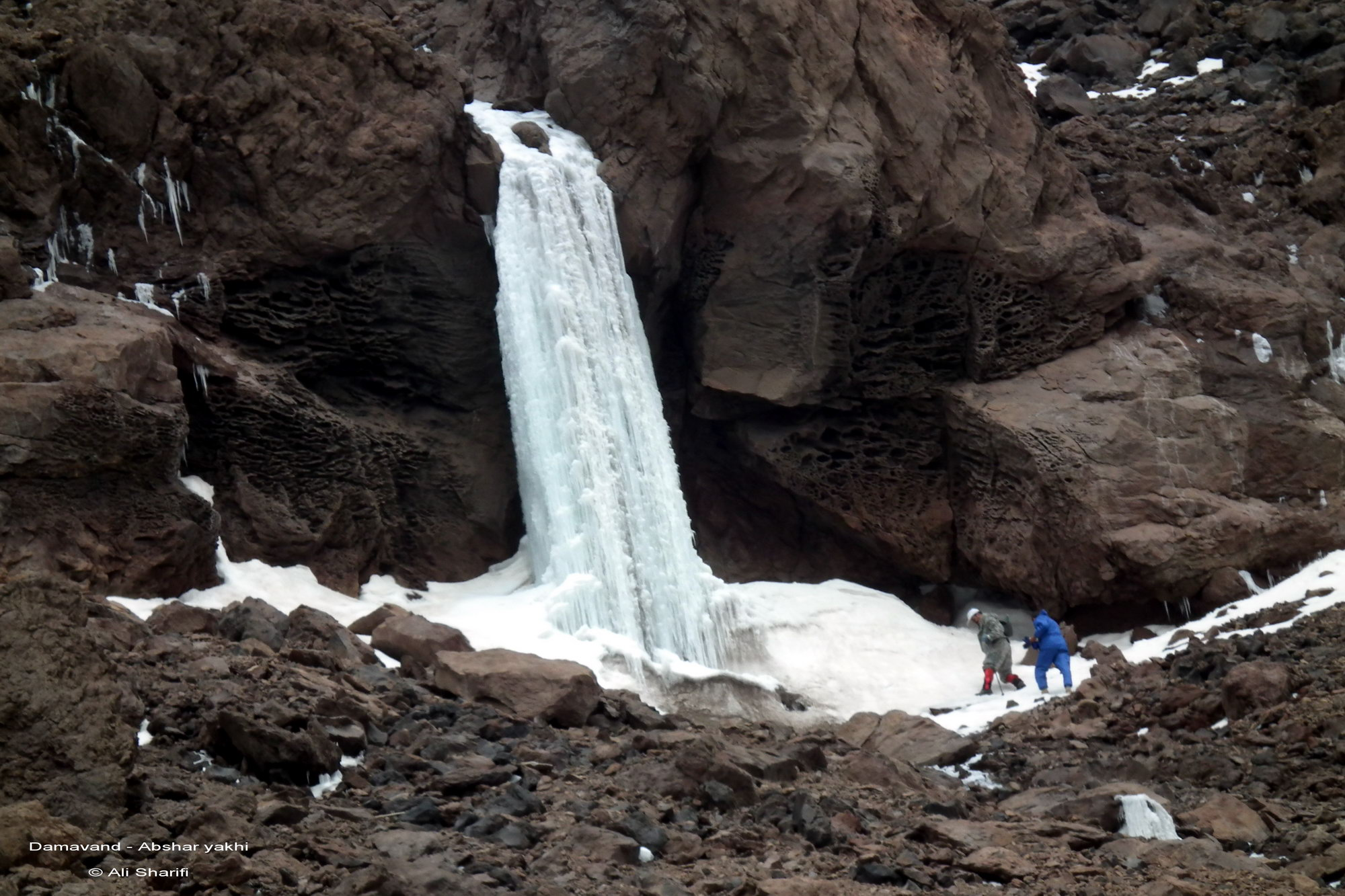
Yakhi Waterfall

Yakhi Waterfall or Abshar Yakhi (Persian: آبشار یخی lit. 'Iced Fall' or 'Frozen Fall'), is a waterfall in Amol, Iran, located near the southern part of Mount Damavand.

The height of Yakhi waterfall is about 8 to 12 meters in height. and it is located at 5100 meters of elevation. The waterfall is completely frozen throughout the year.
