= Tochal =

Mountain in Iran

- توچال (Persian)
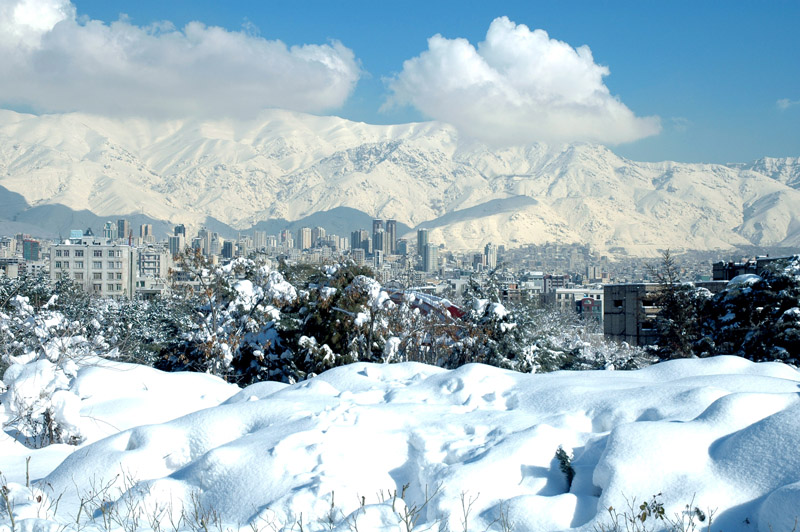
- Mount Tochal, located to the north of Tehran.

Highest point
- Elevation: 3,964 m (13,005 ft)https://www.mountain-forecast.com/peaks/Tochal
- Coordinates: ≈35°53′04″N 51°25′09″E

Geography
- Location within Iran
- Location: Tehran province, Iran
- Parent range: Alborz

Tochal (Persian: توچال), is a mountain and ski resort located on the Alborz mountain range, adjacent to the metropolitan area of Greater Tehran Region in northern Iran. It includes a 12-kilometre-long (7.5 mi) ridge. Its highest peak, also called Tochal, is at an elevation of 3,964 metres (13,005 ft) above sea level.

A gondola lift runs from Tehran to the Tochal ski resort and hotel, all as a part of Tochal Complex.

== Peaks ==
A number of peaks are accessible from the Tochal main ridge or by their own climbing paths. Peaks (from west to east) include:

- Lavarak (3,560 m [11,680 ft]): accessible by main Tochal ridge or Imamzade Davood climbing path.
- Bazarak (3,753 m [12,313 ft]): accessible by main Tochal ridge or Imamzade Davood climbing path.
- Palang-chal (3,520 m [11,550 ft]): accessible from Darakeh valley and Palangchal Shelter.
- Sar-Bazarak (3,640 m [11,940 ft]): accessible from Palangchal peak and main Tochal ridge.
- Shah-Neshin (3,875 m [12,713 ft]): accessible from Tochal main ridge, Hezarcham path and south (Abshar-Dogholoo) ridge.
- Tochal (3,964 m [13,005 ft]): The highest peak of the range, accessible by any climbing path that ends on the Tochal main ridge. The usual path from Tehran is by the south ridge (normally from Shirpala shelter and Siahsang hut).
- Spilit (3,120 m [10,240 ft]): through Band-yakh-chal and Shervin hut by rock climbing or Klakchal ridge.
- West Lezon (3,585 m [11,762 ft]): accessible from Tochal main ridge, Kolakchal shelter or Shirpala shelter.
- East Lezon or Piaz-chal (3,540 m [11,610 ft]): accessible from Tochal main ridge, Kolakchal shelter or Shirpala shelter.
- Kolak-chal (3,350 m [10,990 ft]): from Kolakchal shelter (through Golab-dareh valley, Vezbad valley or Jamshidieh park)
- Siah-band (3,320 m [10,890 ft]): from Dar-abad valley and Dar-abad hut.

== Gondola lift ==
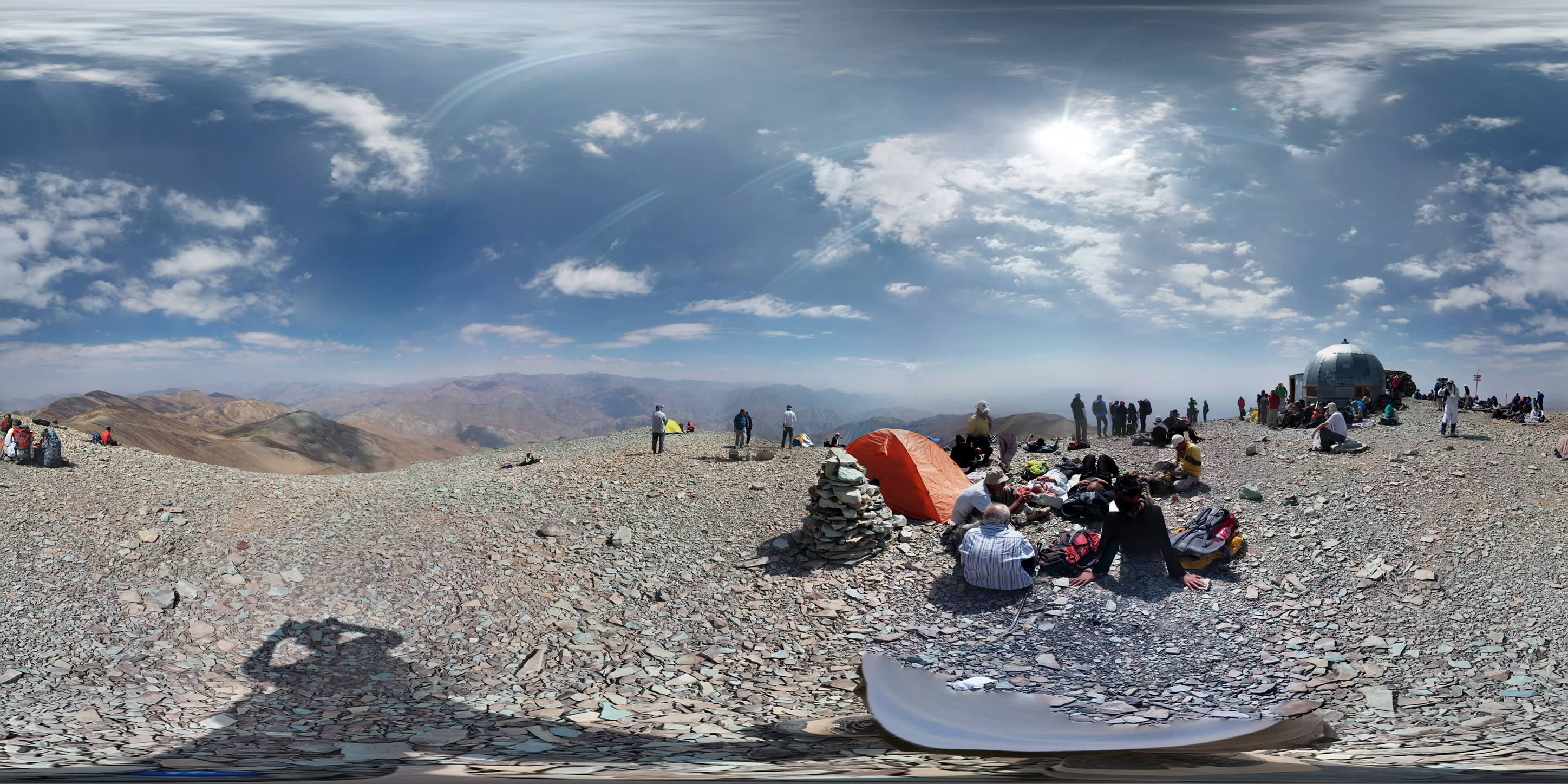
A 360° View from Tochal peak. Visible are the two shelters on the peak, as well as Mount Damavand on the horizon, as well as Tehran.

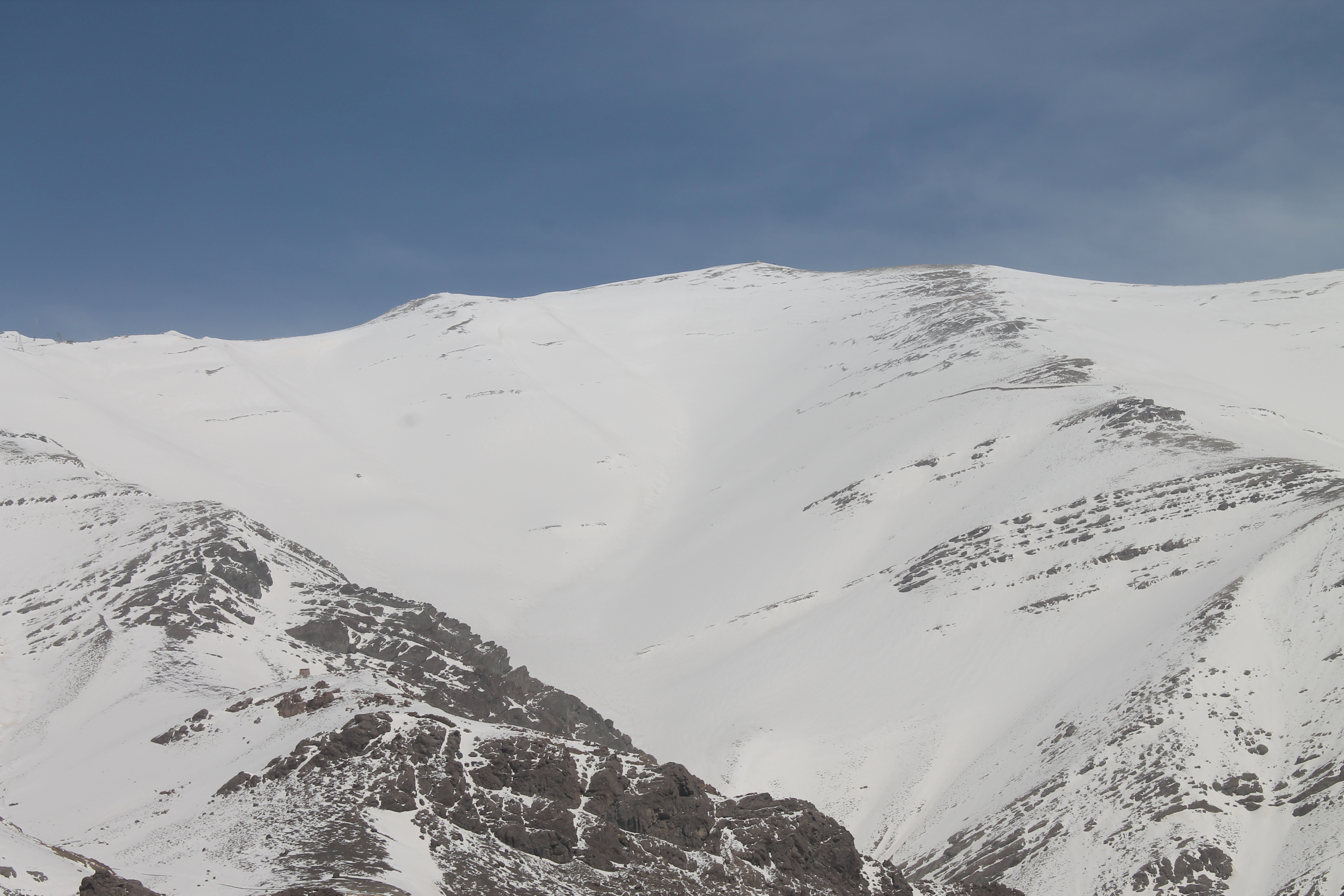
View of Tochal peak from Velenjak mountains

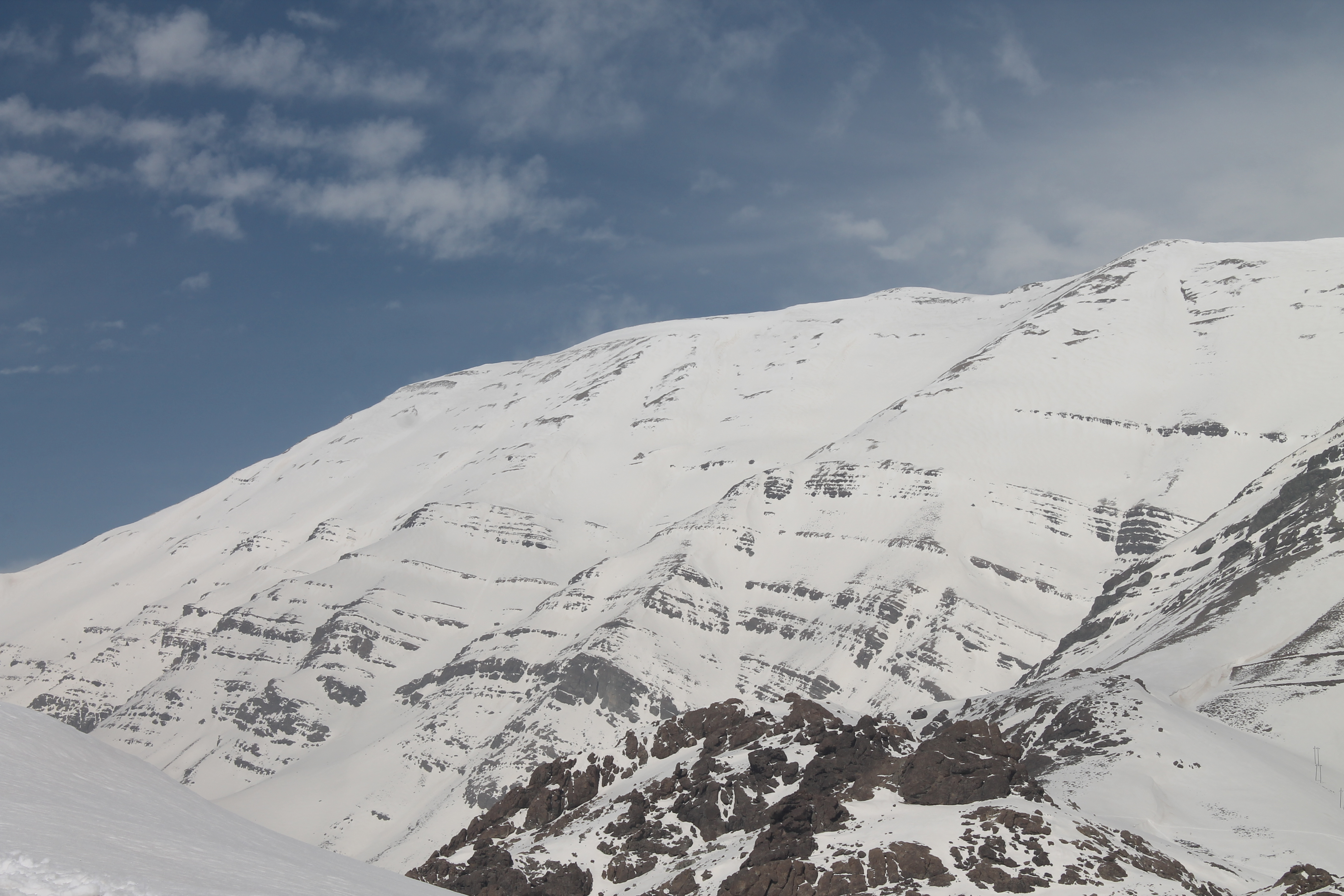
Shahneshin mountains, west side of Tochal peak

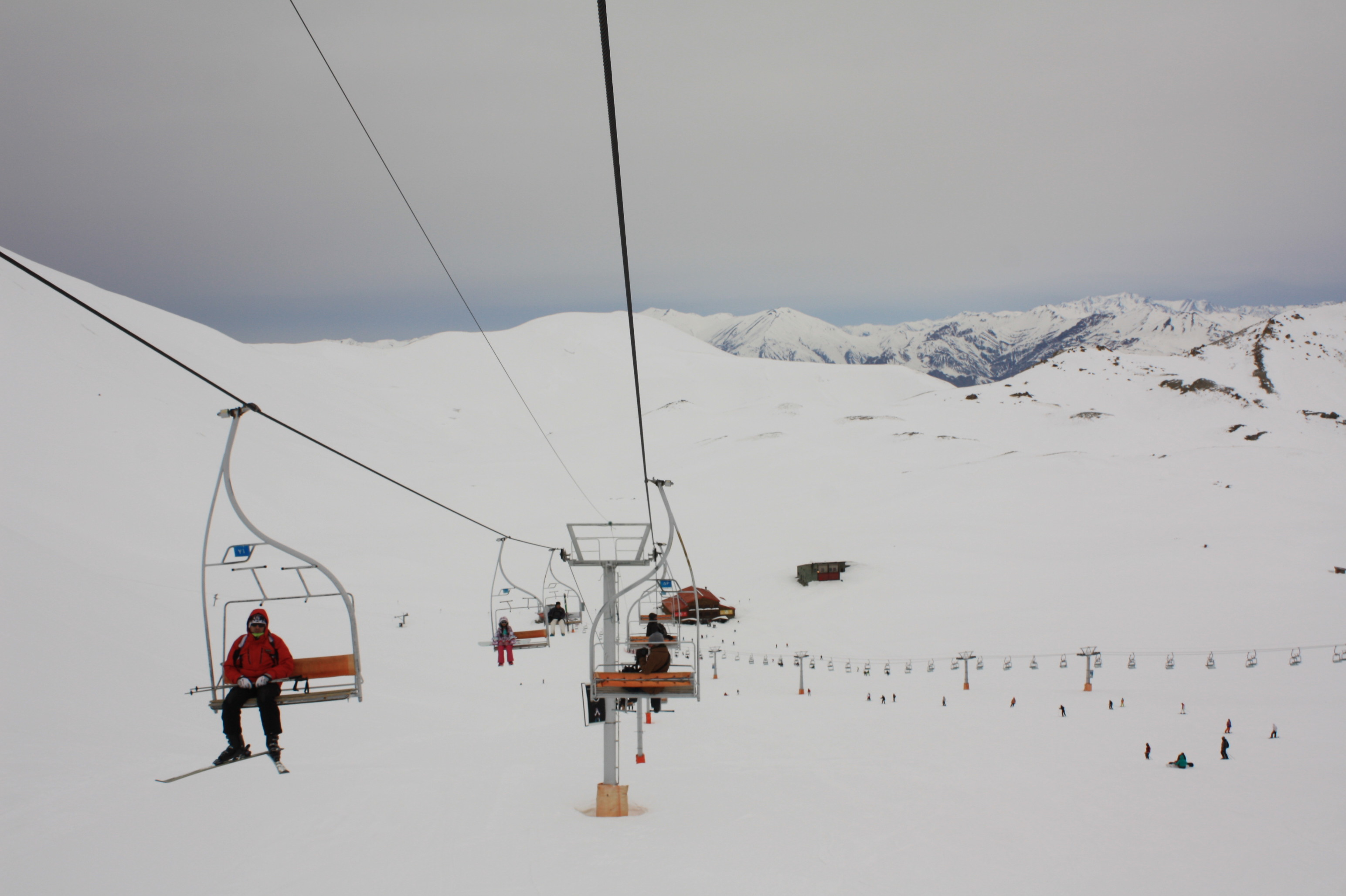
Tochal Ski Resort

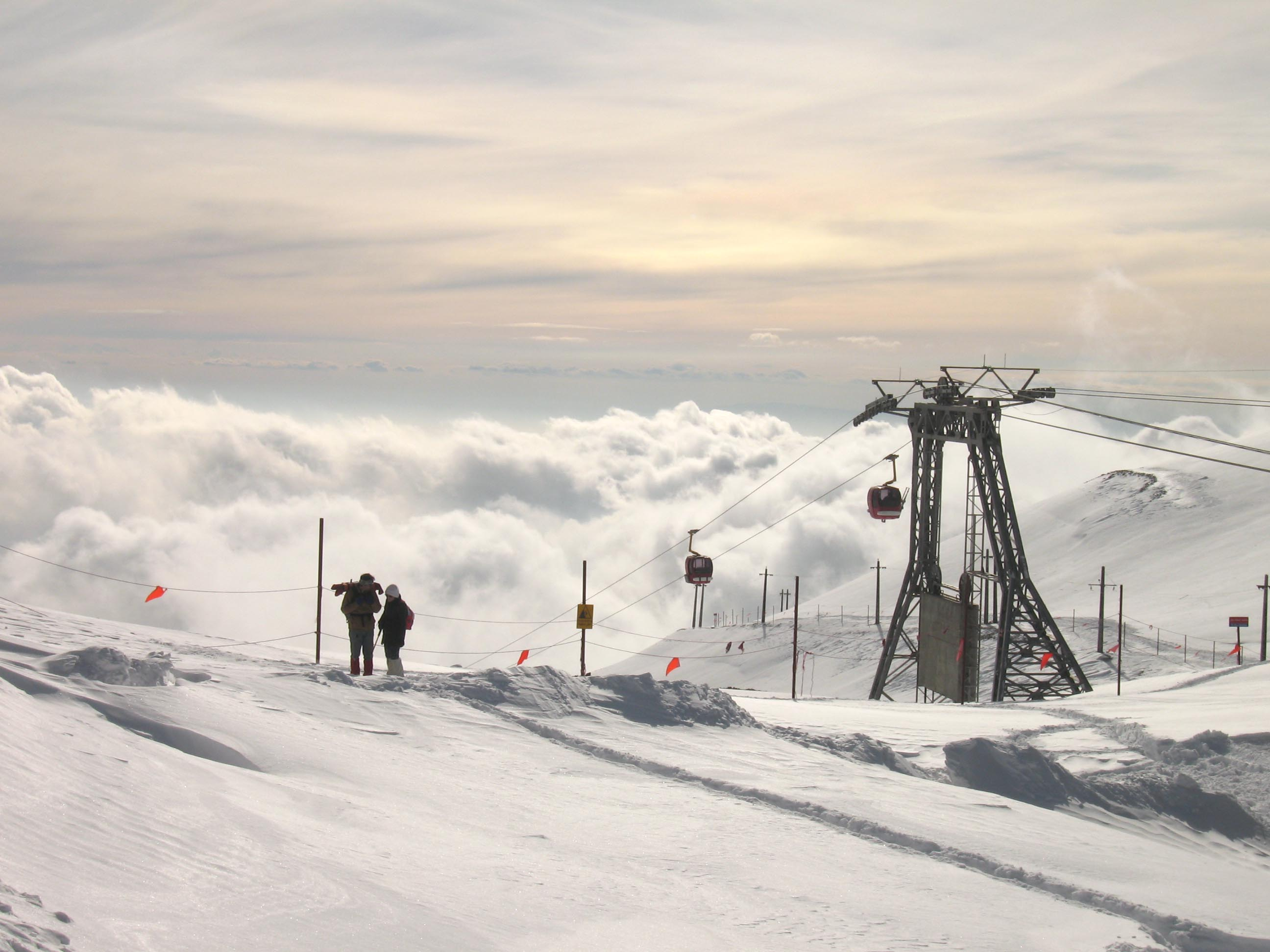
telecabin station at Tochal mountain near Tehran. 3,800 meters above sea level

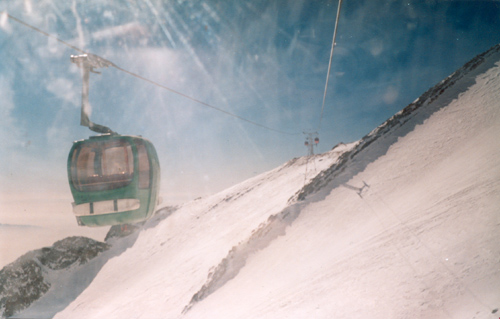
Tochal Telecabin, gondola lift for skiers and other visitors to Tochal

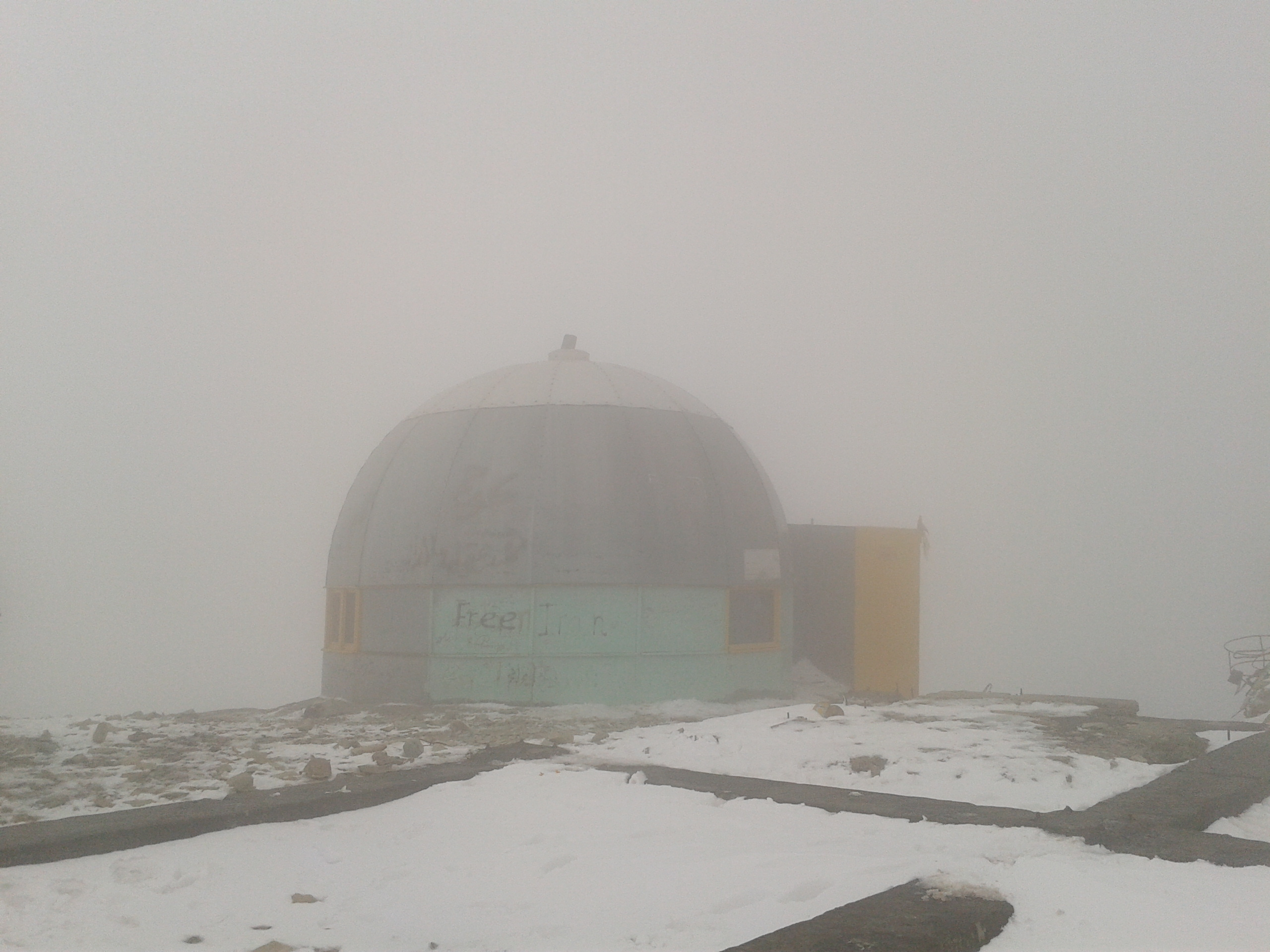
Tochal Peak's Shelter November 2012

Tochal has a long gondola lift which begins from Velenjak valley at 1,900 m (6,200 ft) and ends in the last station at 3740m near the main ridge of Tochal. This gondola lift is used for accessing ski resorts and other recreational centers on the mountain.

== Location in central Alborz ==
Map of central Alborz	Peaks:	1 Alam-Kuh
−25 to 500 m (−82 to 1,640 ft) 500 to 1,500 m (1,600 to 4,900 ft) 1,500 to 2,500 m (4,900 to 8,200 ft) 2,500 to 3,500 m (8,200 to 11,500 ft) 3,500 to 4,500 m (11,500 to 14,800 ft) 4,500 to 5,610 m (14,760 to 18,410 ft)	2 Azad Kuh	3 Damavand
−25 to 500 m (−82 to 1,640 ft) 500 to 1,500 m (1,600 to 4,900 ft) 1,500 to 2,500 m (4,900 to 8,200 ft) 2,500 to 3,500 m (8,200 to 11,500 ft) 3,500 to 4,500 m (11,500 to 14,800 ft) 4,500 to 5,610 m (14,760 to 18,410 ft)	4 Do Berar	5 Do Khaharan
−25 to 500 m (−82 to 1,640 ft) 500 to 1,500 m (1,600 to 4,900 ft) 1,500 to 2,500 m (4,900 to 8,200 ft) 2,500 to 3,500 m (8,200 to 11,500 ft) 3,500 to 4,500 m (11,500 to 14,800 ft) 4,500 to 5,610 m (14,760 to 18,410 ft)	6 Ghal'eh Gardan	7 Gorg
−25 to 500 m (−82 to 1,640 ft) 500 to 1,500 m (1,600 to 4,900 ft) 1,500 to 2,500 m (4,900 to 8,200 ft) 2,500 to 3,500 m (8,200 to 11,500 ft) 3,500 to 4,500 m (11,500 to 14,800 ft) 4,500 to 5,610 m (14,760 to 18,410 ft)	8 Kholeno	9 Mehr Chal
−25 to 500 m (−82 to 1,640 ft) 500 to 1,500 m (1,600 to 4,900 ft) 1,500 to 2,500 m (4,900 to 8,200 ft) 2,500 to 3,500 m (8,200 to 11,500 ft) 3,500 to 4,500 m (11,500 to 14,800 ft) 4,500 to 5,610 m (14,760 to 18,410 ft)	10 Mishineh Marg	11 Naz
−25 to 500 m (−82 to 1,640 ft) 500 to 1,500 m (1,600 to 4,900 ft) 1,500 to 2,500 m (4,900 to 8,200 ft) 2,500 to 3,500 m (8,200 to 11,500 ft) 3,500 to 4,500 m (11,500 to 14,800 ft) 4,500 to 5,610 m (14,760 to 18,410 ft)	12 Shah Alborz	13 Sialan
−25 to 500 m (−82 to 1,640 ft) 500 to 1,500 m (1,600 to 4,900 ft) 1,500 to 2,500 m (4,900 to 8,200 ft) 2,500 to 3,500 m (8,200 to 11,500 ft) 3,500 to 4,500 m (11,500 to 14,800 ft) 4,500 to 5,610 m (14,760 to 18,410 ft)	14 Tochal	15 Varavašt
−25 to 500 m (−82 to 1,640 ft) 500 to 1,500 m (1,600 to 4,900 ft) 1,500 to 2,500 m (4,900 to 8,200 ft) 2,500 to 3,500 m (8,200 to 11,500 ft) 3,500 to 4,500 m (11,500 to 14,800 ft) 4,500 to 5,610 m (14,760 to 18,410 ft)	Rivers:	0
−25 to 500 m (−82 to 1,640 ft) 500 to 1,500 m (1,600 to 4,900 ft) 1,500 to 2,500 m (4,900 to 8,200 ft) 2,500 to 3,500 m (8,200 to 11,500 ft) 3,500 to 4,500 m (11,500 to 14,800 ft) 4,500 to 5,610 m (14,760 to 18,410 ft)	1 Alamut	2 Chalus
−25 to 500 m (−82 to 1,640 ft) 500 to 1,500 m (1,600 to 4,900 ft) 1,500 to 2,500 m (4,900 to 8,200 ft) 2,500 to 3,500 m (8,200 to 11,500 ft) 3,500 to 4,500 m (11,500 to 14,800 ft) 4,500 to 5,610 m (14,760 to 18,410 ft)	3 Do Hezar	4 Haraz
−25 to 500 m (−82 to 1,640 ft) 500 to 1,500 m (1,600 to 4,900 ft) 1,500 to 2,500 m (4,900 to 8,200 ft) 2,500 to 3,500 m (8,200 to 11,500 ft) 3,500 to 4,500 m (11,500 to 14,800 ft) 4,500 to 5,610 m (14,760 to 18,410 ft)	5 Jajrood	6 Karaj
−25 to 500 m (−82 to 1,640 ft) 500 to 1,500 m (1,600 to 4,900 ft) 1,500 to 2,500 m (4,900 to 8,200 ft) 2,500 to 3,500 m (8,200 to 11,500 ft) 3,500 to 4,500 m (11,500 to 14,800 ft) 4,500 to 5,610 m (14,760 to 18,410 ft)	7 Kojoor	8 Lar
−25 to 500 m (−82 to 1,640 ft) 500 to 1,500 m (1,600 to 4,900 ft) 1,500 to 2,500 m (4,900 to 8,200 ft) 2,500 to 3,500 m (8,200 to 11,500 ft) 3,500 to 4,500 m (11,500 to 14,800 ft) 4,500 to 5,610 m (14,760 to 18,410 ft)	9 Noor	10 Sardab
−25 to 500 m (−82 to 1,640 ft) 500 to 1,500 m (1,600 to 4,900 ft) 1,500 to 2,500 m (4,900 to 8,200 ft) 2,500 to 3,500 m (8,200 to 11,500 ft) 3,500 to 4,500 m (11,500 to 14,800 ft) 4,500 to 5,610 m (14,760 to 18,410 ft)	11 Seh Hazar	12 Shahrood
−25 to 500 m (−82 to 1,640 ft) 500 to 1,500 m (1,600 to 4,900 ft) 1,500 to 2,500 m (4,900 to 8,200 ft) 2,500 to 3,500 m (8,200 to 11,500 ft) 3,500 to 4,500 m (11,500 to 14,800 ft) 4,500 to 5,610 m (14,760 to 18,410 ft)	Cities:	1 Amol
−25 to 500 m (−82 to 1,640 ft) 500 to 1,500 m (1,600 to 4,900 ft) 1,500 to 2,500 m (4,900 to 8,200 ft) 2,500 to 3,500 m (8,200 to 11,500 ft) 3,500 to 4,500 m (11,500 to 14,800 ft) 4,500 to 5,610 m (14,760 to 18,410 ft)	2 Chalus	3 Karaj
−25 to 500 m (−82 to 1,640 ft) 500 to 1,500 m (1,600 to 4,900 ft) 1,500 to 2,500 m (4,900 to 8,200 ft) 2,500 to 3,500 m (8,200 to 11,500 ft) 3,500 to 4,500 m (11,500 to 14,800 ft) 4,500 to 5,610 m (14,760 to 18,410 ft)	Other:	D Dizin
−25 to 500 m (−82 to 1,640 ft) 500 to 1,500 m (1,600 to 4,900 ft) 1,500 to 2,500 m (4,900 to 8,200 ft) 2,500 to 3,500 m (8,200 to 11,500 ft) 3,500 to 4,500 m (11,500 to 14,800 ft) 4,500 to 5,610 m (14,760 to 18,410 ft)	E Emamzadeh Hashem	K Kandovan Tunnel
−25 to 500 m (−82 to 1,640 ft) 500 to 1,500 m (1,600 to 4,900 ft) 1,500 to 2,500 m (4,900 to 8,200 ft) 2,500 to 3,500 m (8,200 to 11,500 ft) 3,500 to 4,500 m (11,500 to 14,800 ft) 4,500 to 5,610 m (14,760 to 18,410 ft)	* Latyan Dam	** Lar Dam

== Opening season ==
Tochal International ski resort, located in Iran's capital Tehran, was officially reopened on 22 January 2024.and 20 December 2025

== Pictures ==
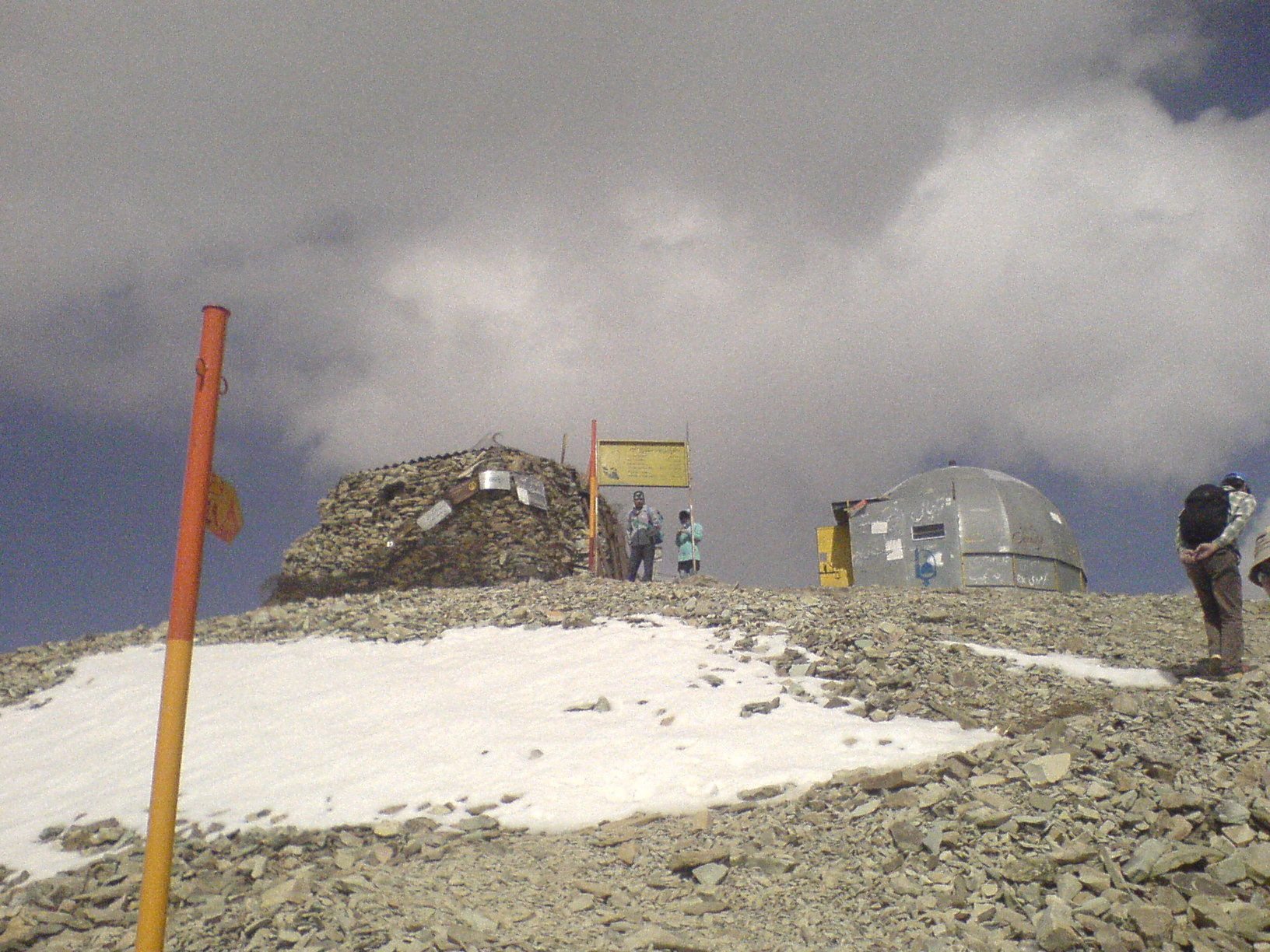
Tochal Peak at 3,964 m (13,005 ft).

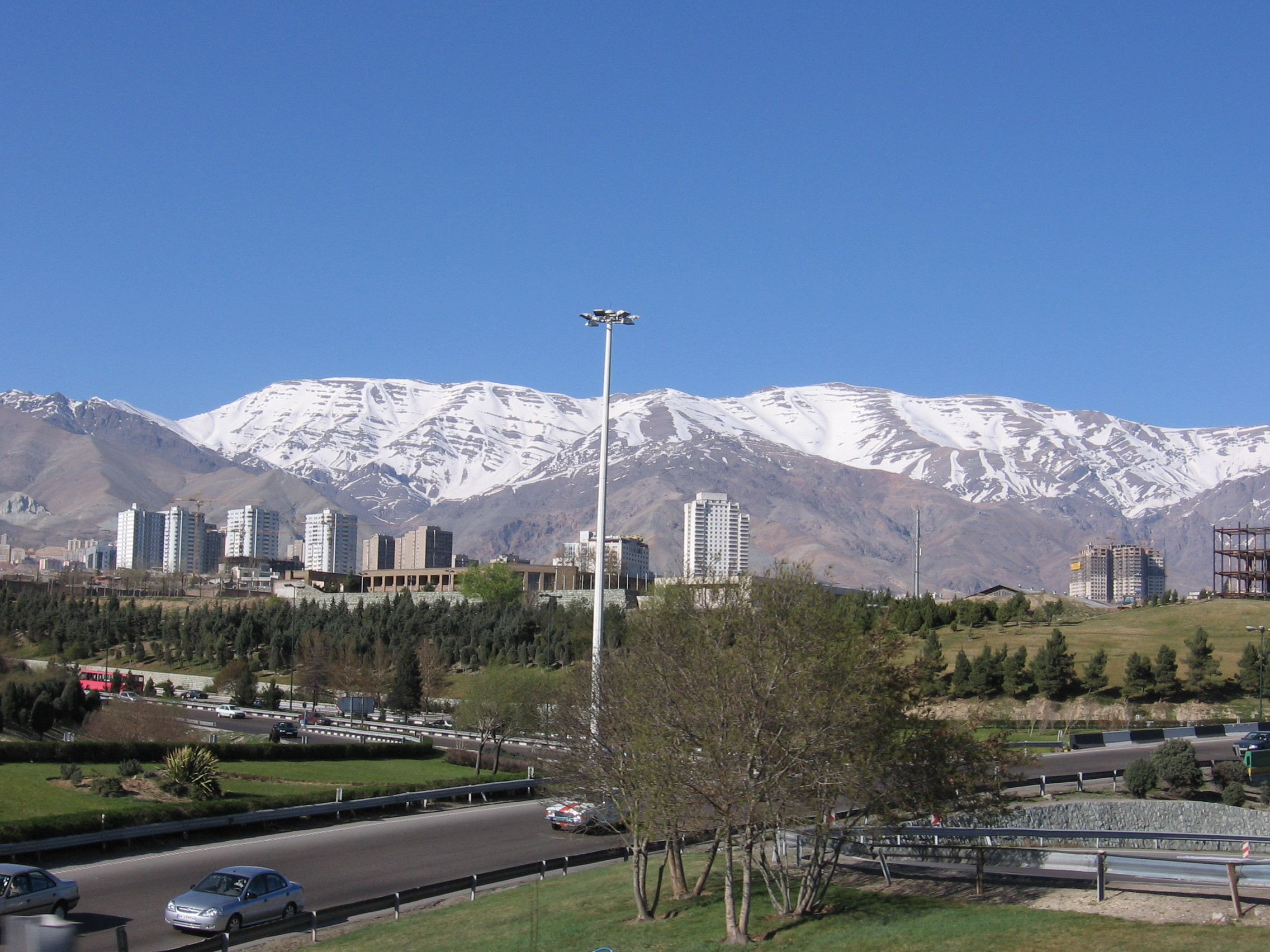
Tochal mountains, Tehran, Iran.

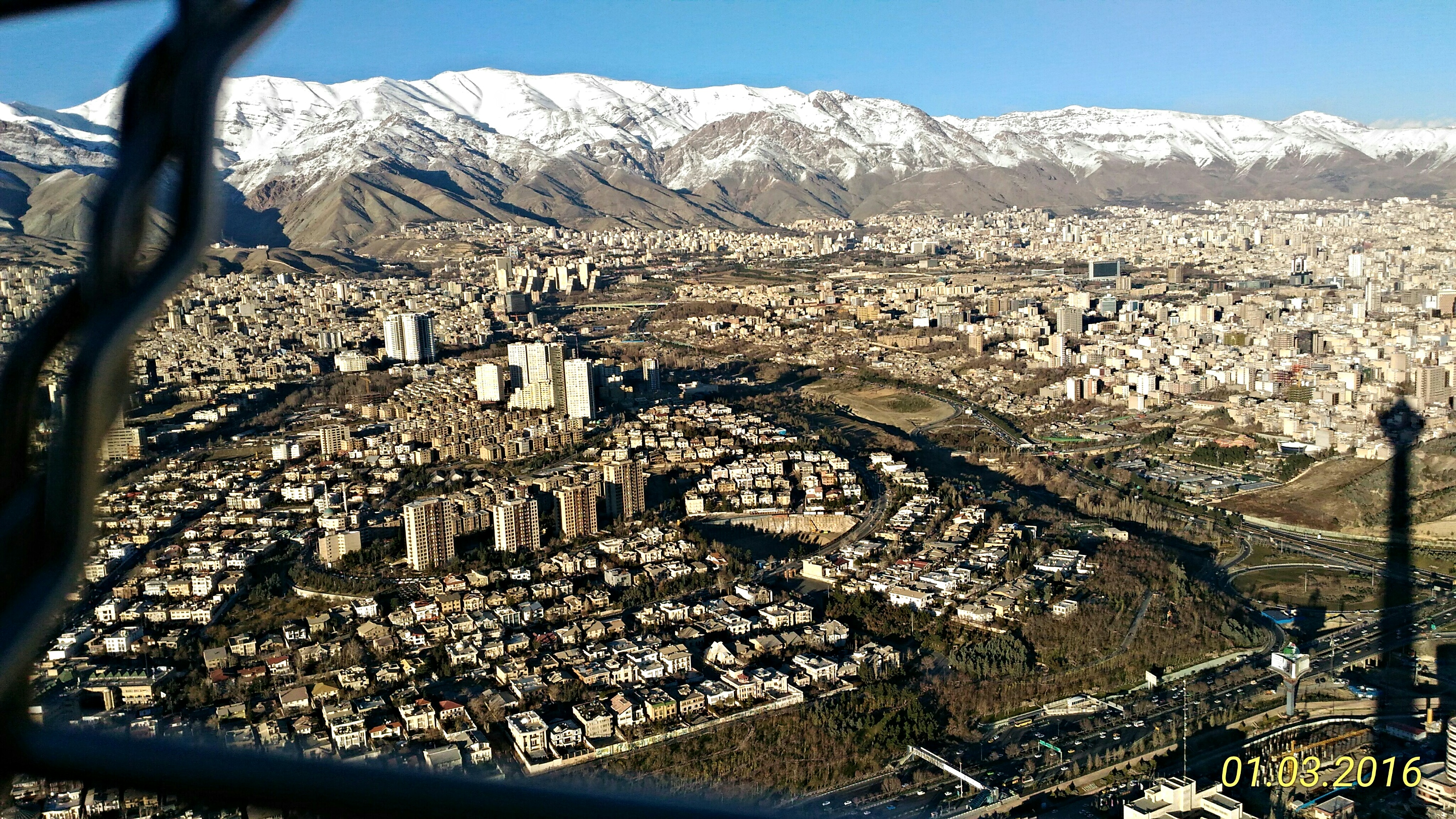
Milad Tower's view to the city and mountains.

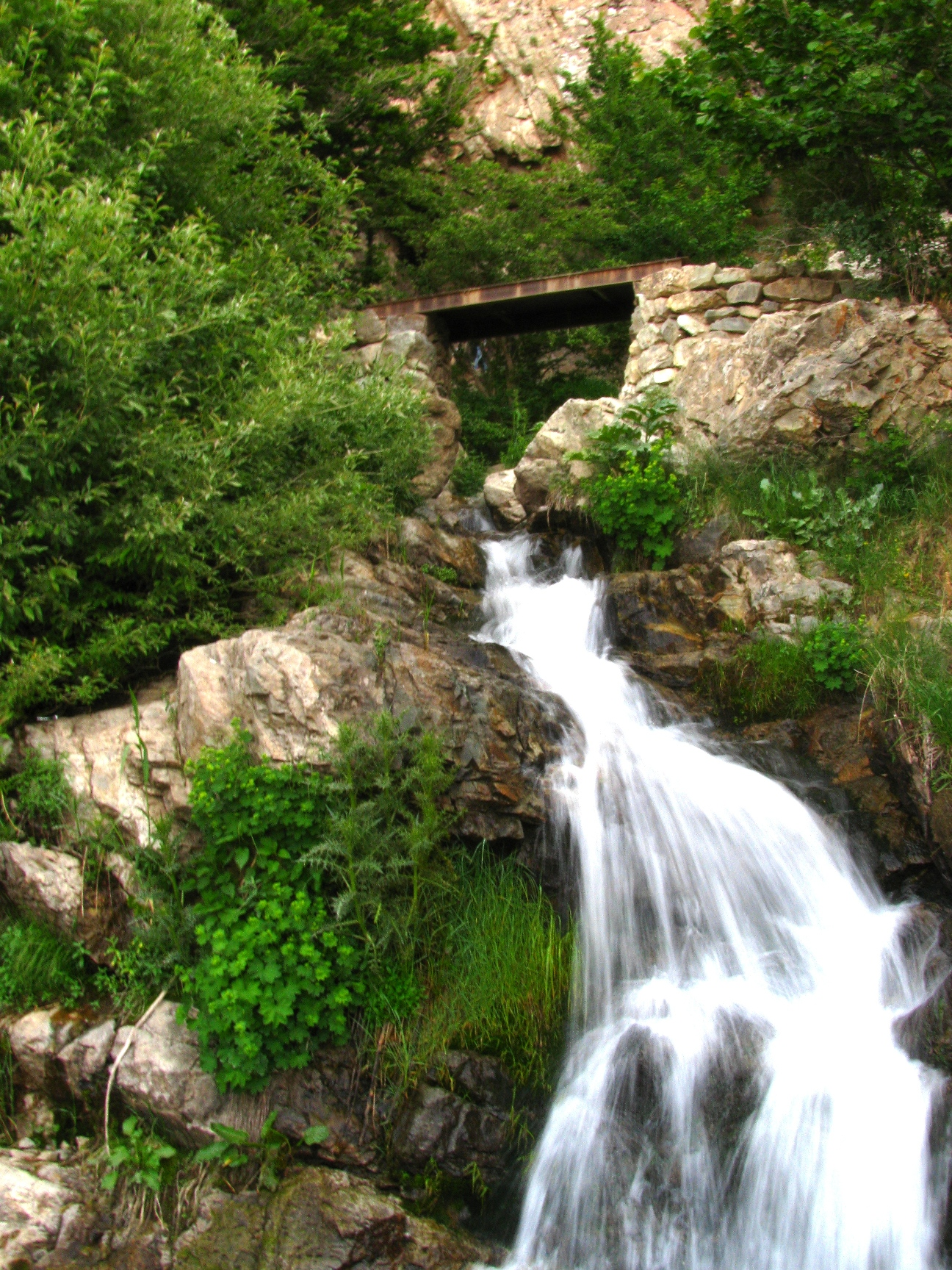
A scene in the vicinity of Shir-pala, Tochal.

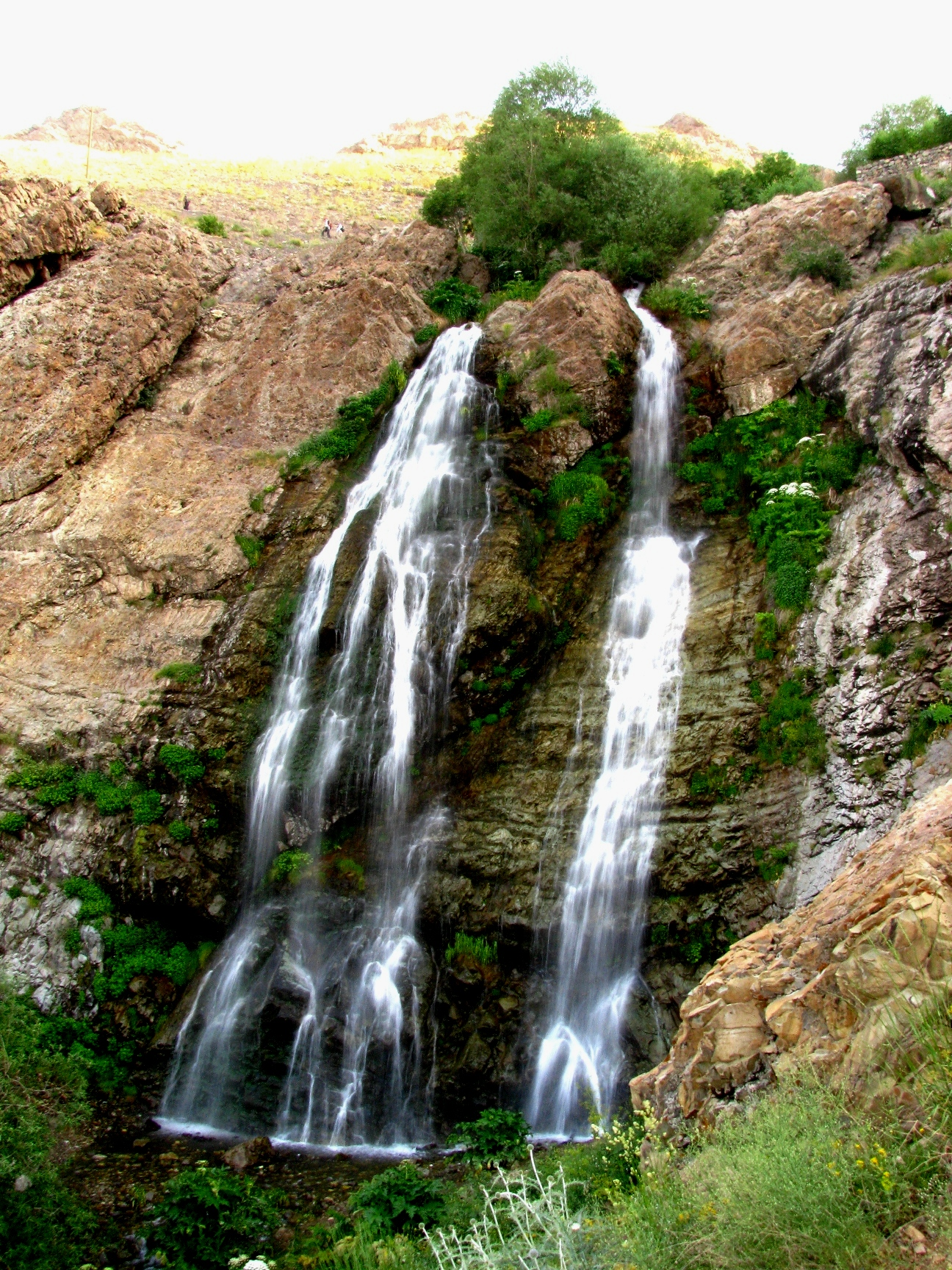
Darband Twin Falls, near Shir-pala, in Tochal main route.

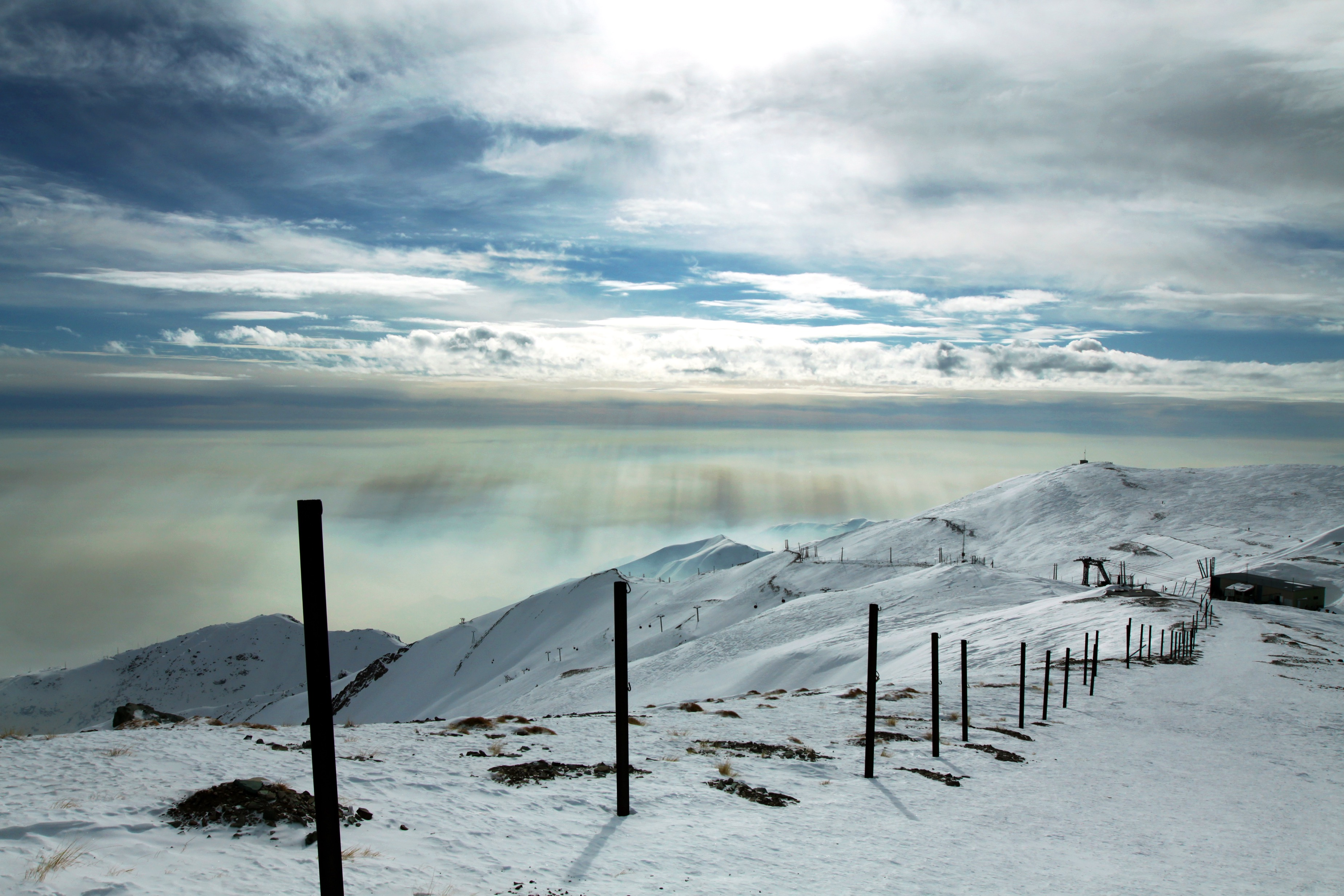
Mt. Tochal, Tehran, Iran

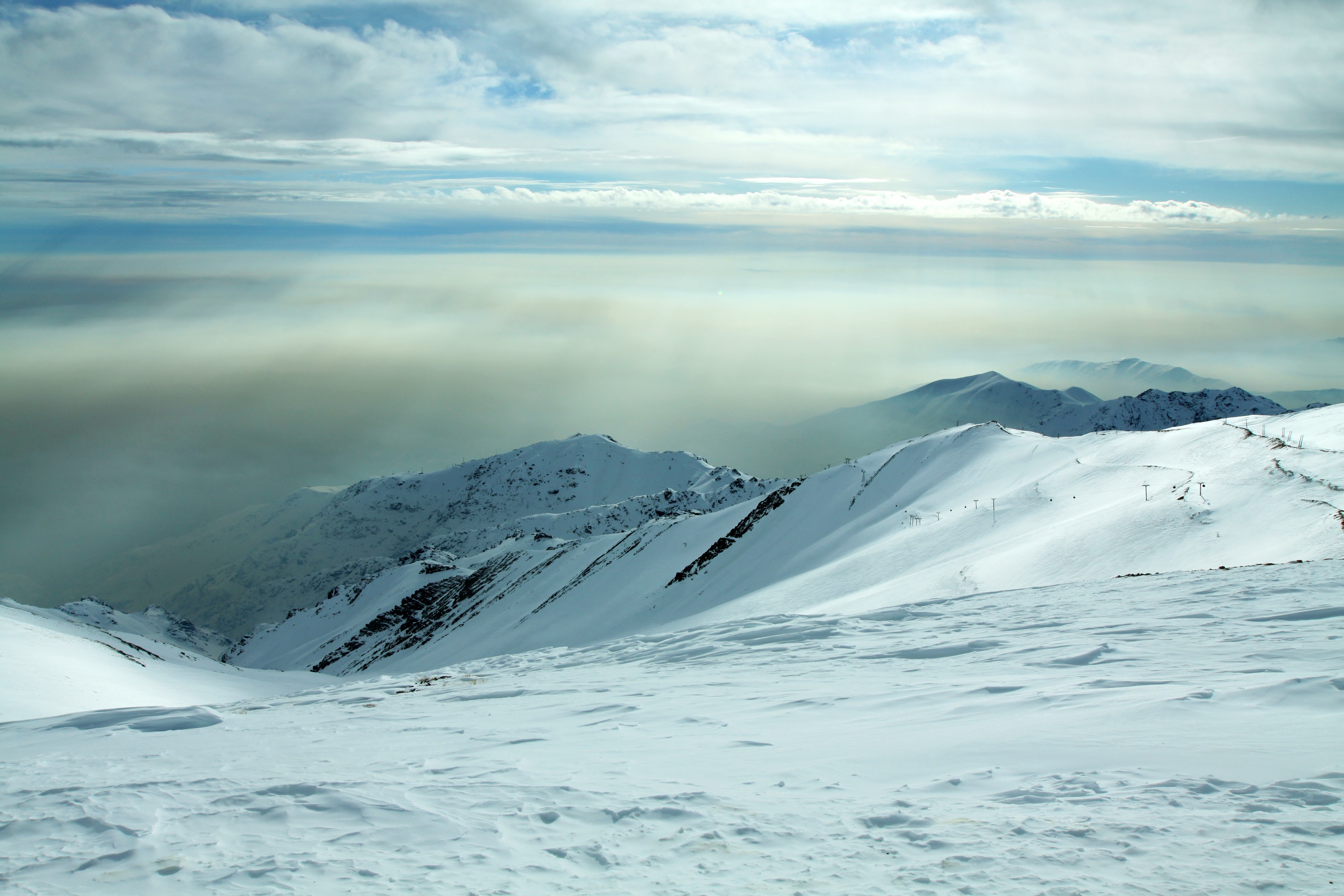
Mt. Tochal, Tehran, Iran

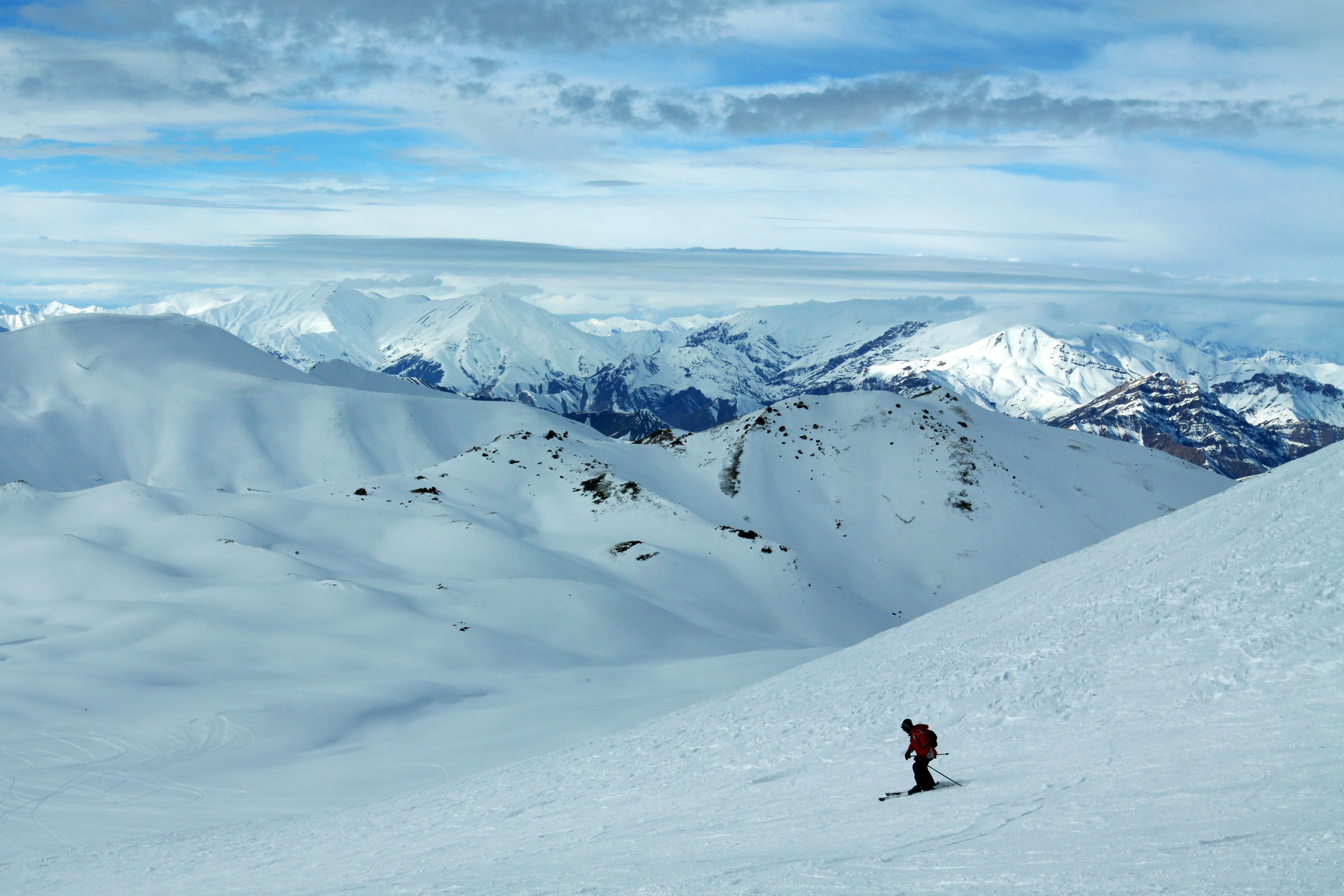
Tochal Ski Resort, Tehran, Iran

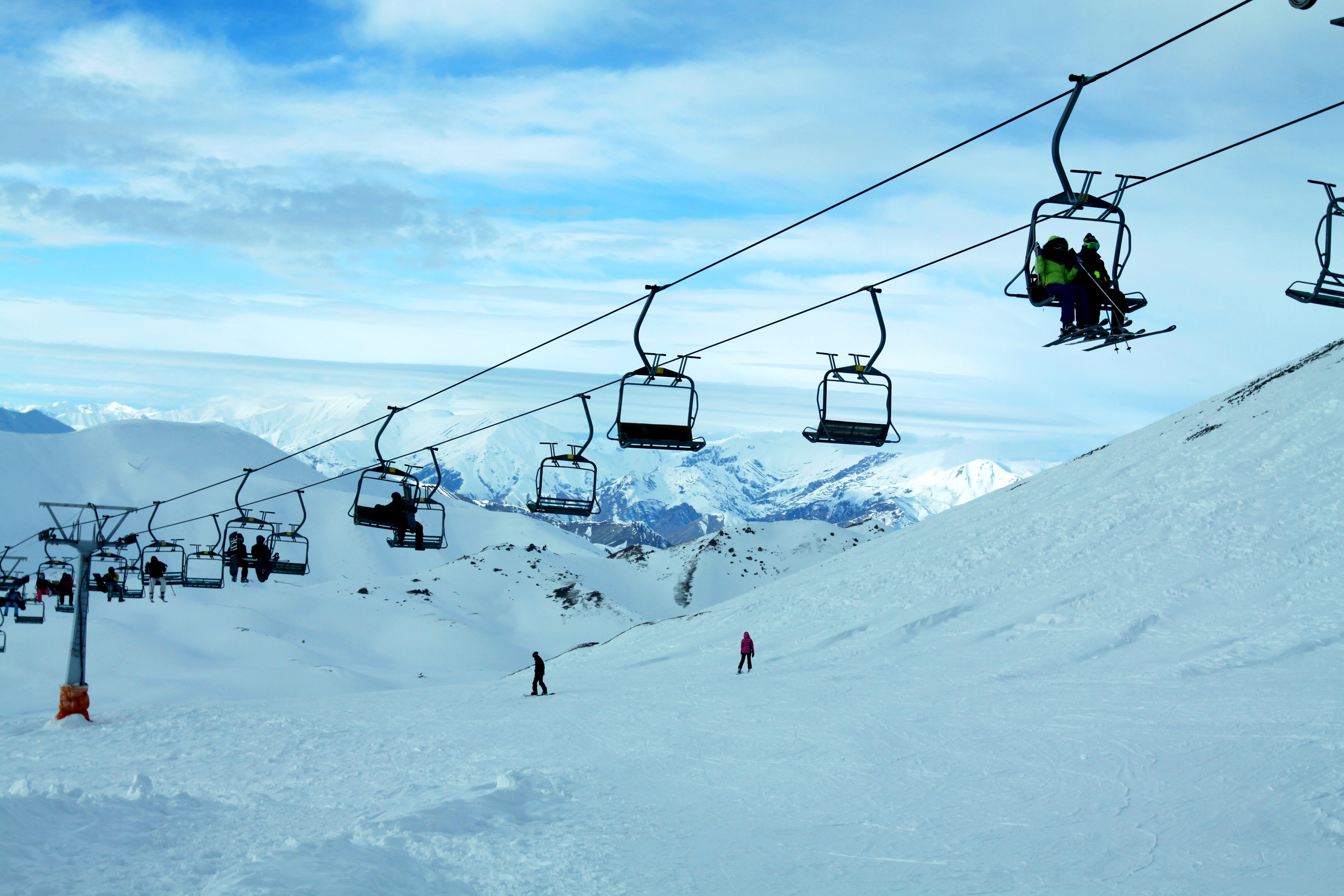
Tochal Ski Resort, Tehran, Iran

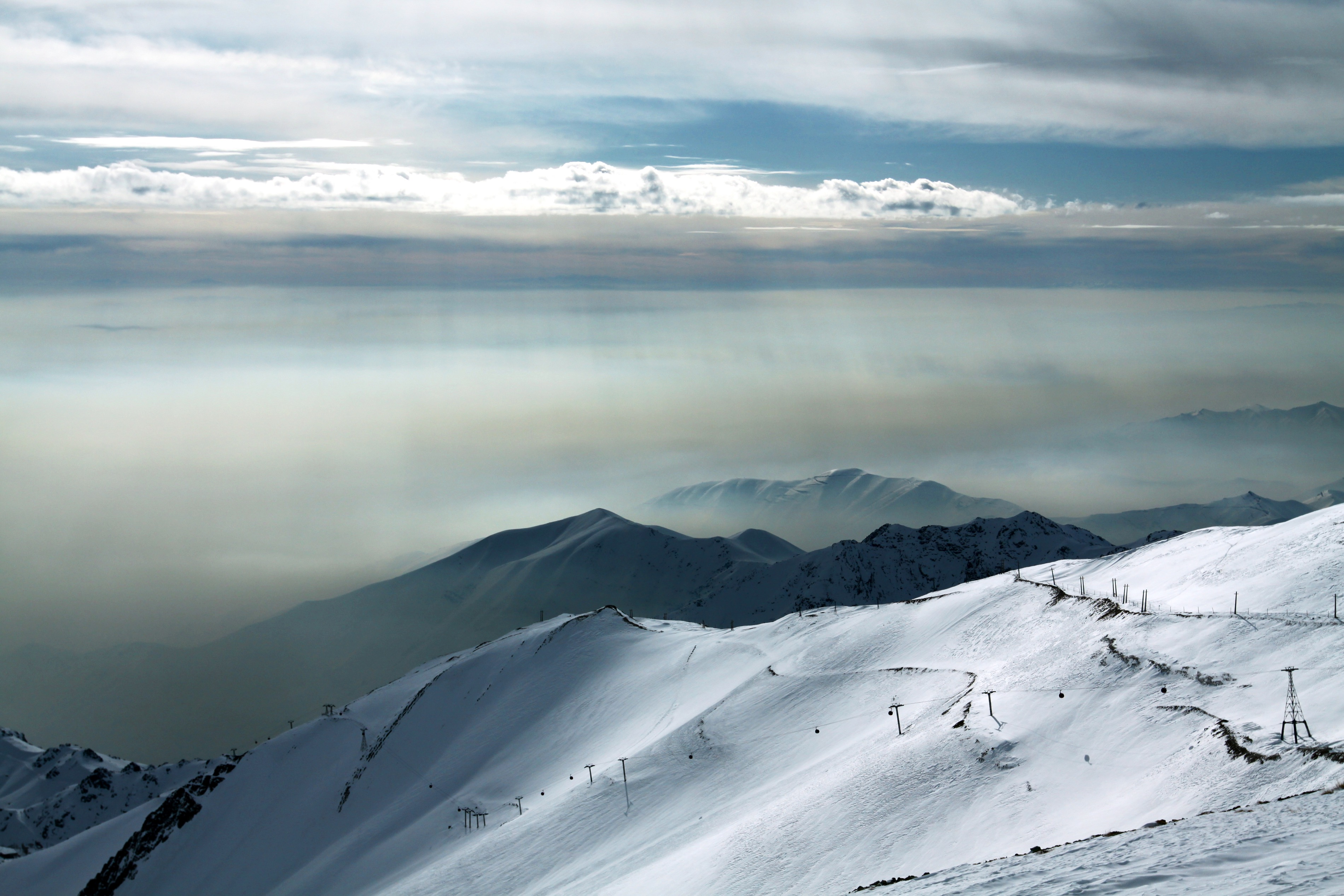
Mt. Tochal, Tehran, Iran

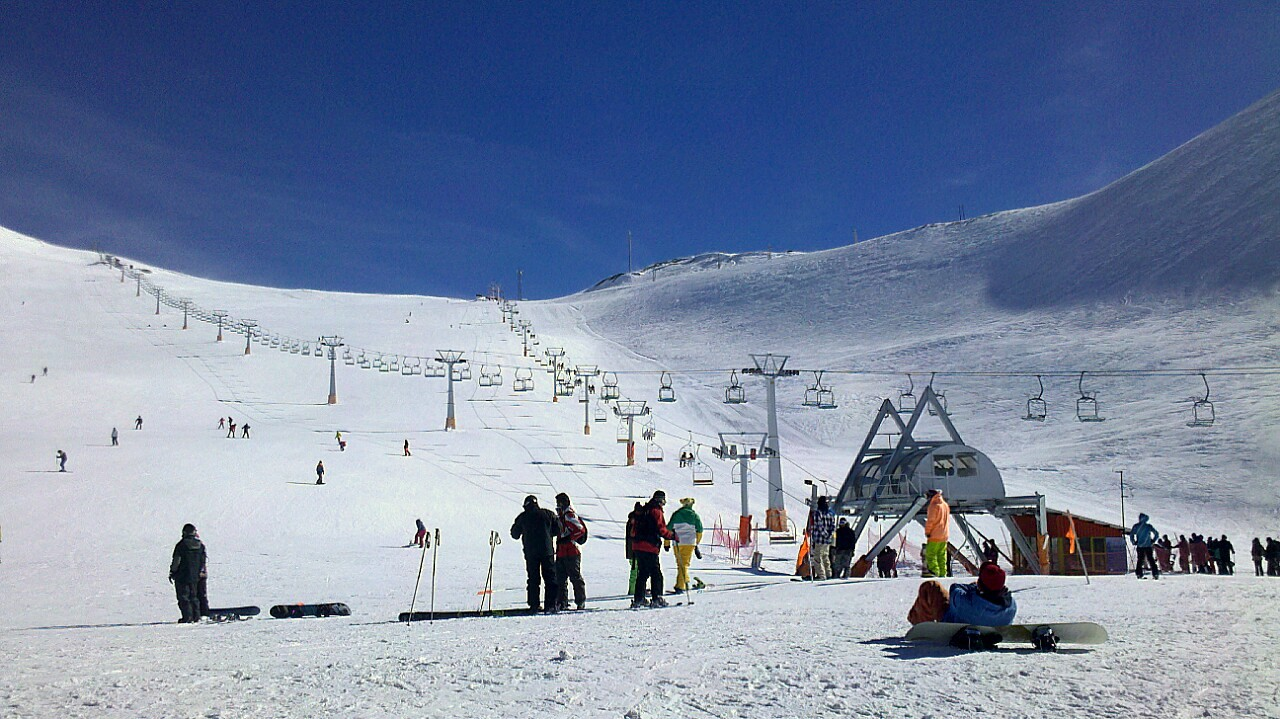

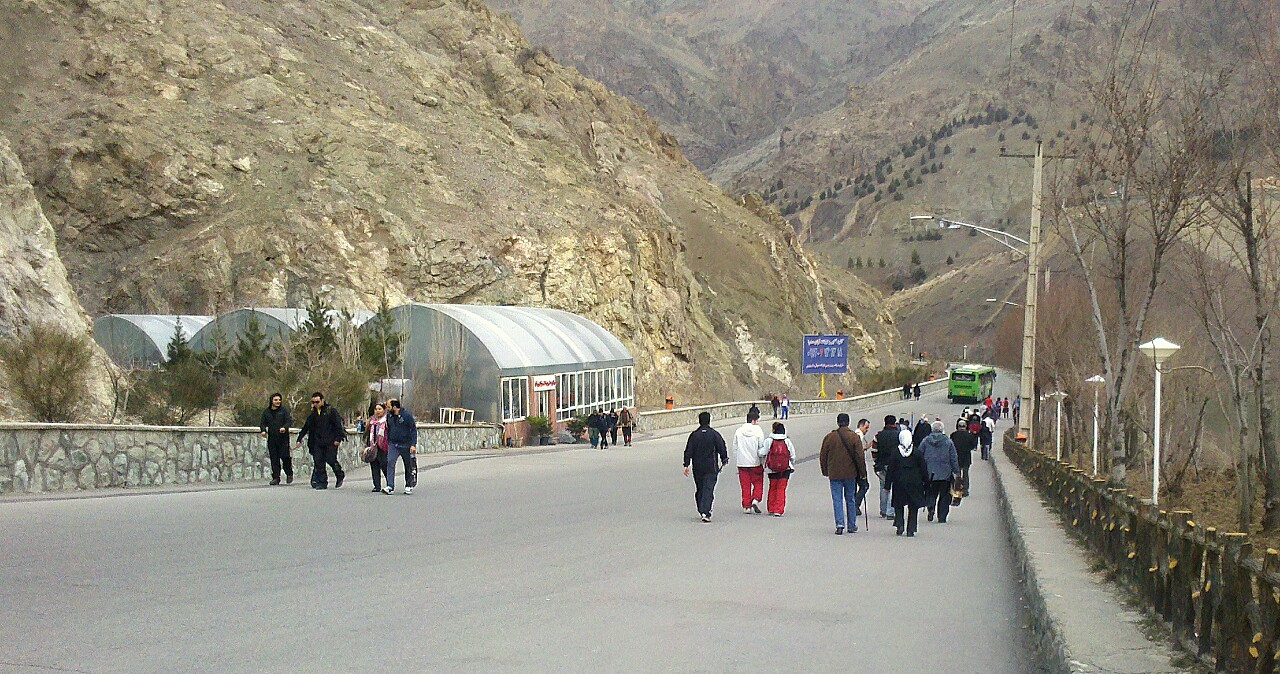

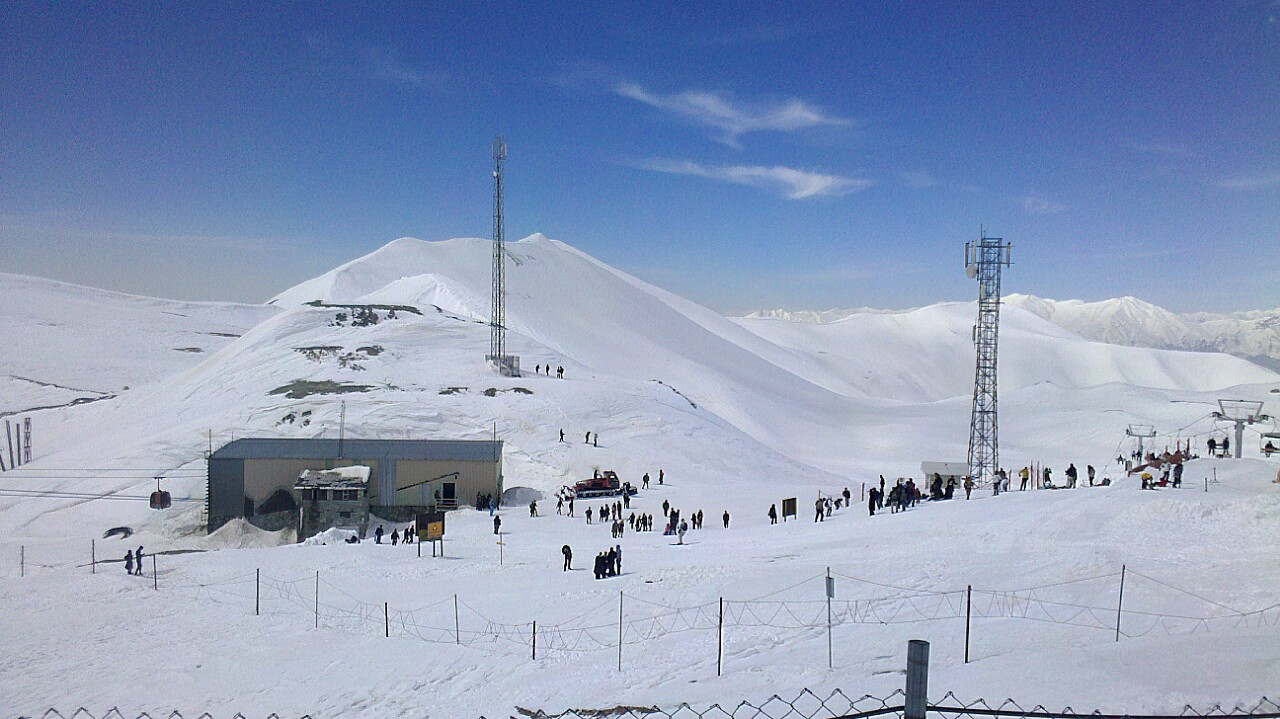

== See also ==
- List of ski areas and resorts in Iran
- Tochal Complex
- Velenjak
