= Kandal =

Kandal or Kondel may refer to:

== Places ==
- Kandal Province, a province of Cambodia
  - Kandal (National Assembly constituency), parliamentary constituency based in Kandal
- Kandal, Hormozgan, a village in Iran
- Kandal, Kohgiluyeh and Boyer-Ahmad, a village in Iran
- Kandal, Kurdistan, a village in Iran
- Kandal, Sistan and Baluchestan, a village in Iran
- Kondel, Sistan and Baluchestan, a village in Iran
- Kandal, West Azerbaijan, a village in Iran
- Kandal, Iraq, a village in Iraq
- Kandal, Norway, a village in Gloppen, Sogn og Fjordane, Norway

== See also ==
- Konidela (disambiguation)
- Kandala (disambiguation)
- Kandalan (disambiguation)
- Kandali (disambiguation)
- Kandel (disambiguation)
- Kanda (disambiguation)
- Kandla, a port in Gujarat state, India
- Kandhla, town in Uttar Pradesh, India
  - Kandhlawi, toponymic surname from the town
- Khandala, hill station in Maharashtra, India
- Kandhal Jadeja, Indian politician
- Priyanka Kandwal, Indian actress
