= Khand =

Khand may refer to:

== People ==
- Bal Krishna Khand, a Nepalese politician
- Imran Khand, a British businessman

== Places ==
=== India ===
- Khanda, a big village in Haryana
- Khand (Bansagar), a town in Madhya Pradesh
- Khanda Kheri, a village in Hisar district, Haryana
- Khand, Mawal, a village in Pune district, Maharashtra
- Khand, Vikramgad, a village in Palghar district, Maharashtra
- Malaj Khand, a city in Balaghat district in Madhya Pradesh

=== Fictional ===
- Khand, a country in Middle-earth in J. R. R. Tolkien's legendarium

== Other ==
- Muscovado, a type of sugar called khand in Indian English
- Pauson–Khand reaction, an organic chemical reaction
- Sach Khand, a Sikh religious concept
- Khande di Pahul, the Sikh ceremony of initiation also known as Amrit Sanchar
- Khand or Kāṇḍa, a Sanskrit word meaning "chapter", used in the names of the chapters of some Hindu books, e.g. the Ramayana

== See also ==
- Kand (disambiguation)
- Khanda (disambiguation)
- Kandha (disambiguation)
- Kanda (disambiguation)
- Kenda (disambiguation)
- Khonds, a tribal people of India
