= Bagh Gol =

Bagh Gol or Bagh-e Gol (Persian: باغ گل) may refer to:

- Bagh-e Gol, Isfahan
- Bagh-e Gol, Kerman
- Bagh Gol, Tehran
- Bagh-e Gol Gol
