= Darband Sar =

Neighborhood in Tehran province, Iran

Darband Sar Persian: دربندسر
- Neighborhood
- Location within Iran
- Coordinates: 36°01′15″N 51°28′34″E
- Country: Iran
- Province: Tehran
- County: Shemiranat
- District: Rudbar-e Qasran
- City: Shemshak

Population (2011)
  - Total: 515
- Time zone: UTC+3:30 (IRST)
- Website: shemshakdarbandsar.ir

Darband Sar (Persian: دربندسر) (Note: Also romanized as Darbandsar; also known as Darm-e Sar) is a neighborhood in the city of Shemshak in Rudbar-e Qasran District of Shemiranat County, Tehran province, Iran.

== Demographics ==
=== Population ===
At the time of the 2006 National Census, Darband Sar's population was 843 in 256 households, when it was a village in Rudbar-e Qasran Rural District. The following census in 2011 counted 515 people in 168 households.

In 2012, the villages of Darband Sar, Darrud, Jirud, Sefidestan, Shemshak-e Bala, and Shemshak-e Pain merged to form the city of Shemshak.
