= Konidela (disambiguation) =

Konidela may refer to:

- Konidela (surname)
- Konidela–Allu family, an Indian film family
- Konidela, Kurnool district, a village in Kurnool district, Andhra Pradesh, India
- Konidela, Nandyal district, a village in Nandyal district, Andhra Pradesh, India
- Konidela Production Company, an Indian film production company

== See also ==
- Kandala (disambiguation)
- Kandal (disambiguation)
- Kandalan (disambiguation)
- Kandali (disambiguation)
- Kandel (disambiguation)
- Kanda (disambiguation)
