= Darrud, Tehran =

Neighborhood in Tehran province, Iran

Darrud Persian: درود
- Neighborhood
- Location within Iran
- Coordinates: 36°00′18″N 51°28′59″E
- Country: Iran
- Province: Tehran
- County: Shemiranat
- District: Rudbar-e Qasran
- City: Shemshak

Population (2011)
  - Total: 199
- Time zone: UTC+3:30 (IRST)

Darrud (Persian: درود) (Note: Also romanized as Darrūd; also known as Darrous and Darrūs) is a neighborhood in the city of Shemshak in Rudbar-e Qasran District of Shemiranat County, Tehran province, Iran.

== Demographics ==
=== Population ===
At the time of the 2006 National Census, Darrud's population was 188 in 56 households, when it was a village in Rudbar-e Qasran Rural District. The following census in 2011 counted 199 people in 67 households.

In 2012, the villages of Darband Sar, Darrud, Jirud, Sefidestan, Shemshak-e Bala, and Shemshak-e Pain merged to establish the city of Shemshak.
