= Kandilli =

Kandilli may refer to

== Places ==
- Kandilli, Istanbul, a neighborhood in Üsküdar district of Istanbul, Turkey
- Kandilli, Zonguldak, a town in Zonguldak, Turkey known formerly as Armutçuk
- Kandilli, Saimbeyli, a village in Saimbeyli district of Adana Province, Turkey
- Kandilli, Bozüyük, a village in Bozüyük district of Bilecik Province, Turkey

== Other uses ==
- Kandilli Anatolian High School for Girls, a high school in Kandilli, Istanbul, Turkey
- Kandilli Earthquake Museum, a science museum in Kandilli, Istanbul, Turkey
- Kandilli Observatory, an institution in Kandilli, Istanbul, Turkey dedicated mostly to earthquake science
- Kandilli Ski Resort, a winter sports venue in Erzurum, Turkey
- SS Kandilli, a cargo ship operated by Mustafa Andi Nurak between 1950 and 1957

== See also ==
- Kandil (disambiguation)
- Kandili block, a block (district subdivision) in Tamil Nadu, India
