= Shemshak-e Bala =

Neighborhood in Tehran province, Iran

Shemshak-e Bala Persian: شمشک بالا
- Neighborhood
- Location within Iran
- Country: Iran
- Province: Tehran
- County: Shemiranat
- District: Rudbar-e Qasran
- City: Shemshak

Population (2011)
  - Total: 509
- Time zone: UTC+3:30 (IRST)

Shemshak-e Bala (Persian: شمشک بالا) (Note: Also romanized as Shemshak-e Bālā; also known as Shemshak and Shimshak) is a neighborhood in the city of Shemshak in Rudbar-e Qasran District of Shemiranat County, Tehran province, Iran.

== Demographics ==
=== Population ===
At the time of the 2006 National Census, Shemshak-e Bala's population was 672 in 192 households, when it was a village in Rudbar-e Qasran Rural District. The following census in 2011 counted 509 people in 189 households.

In 2012, the villages of Darband Sar, Darrud, Jirud, Sefidestan, Shemshak-e Bala, and Shemshak-e Pain merged to establish the city of Shemshak.
