= Aigel =

Aigel ايگل
- Village
- Location within Iran
- Coordinates: 35°54′43″N 51°29′14″E
- Country: Iran
- Province: Tehran
- County: Shemiranat
- Bakhsh: Rudbar-e Qasran
- Rural District: Rudbar-e Qasran

Population (2006)
  - Total: 421
- Time zone: UTC+3:30 (IRST)
  - Summer (DST): UTC+4:30 (IRDT)

Aigel (Persian: ايگل, also Romanized as Āīgel, Īgel, Āīgal, and Īgol) is a village in Rudbar-e Qasran Rural District, Rudbar-e Qasran District, Shemiranat County, Tehran Province, Iran. At the 2006 census, its population was 421, in 131 families.
