= Rudak, Tehran =

Village in Tehran province, Iran

Rudak Persian: رودک
- Village
- Location within Iran
- Coordinates: 35°50′55″N 51°33′04″E
- Country: Iran
- Province: Tehran
- County: Shemiranat
- District: Rudbar-e Qasran
- Rural District: Rudbar-e Qasran

Population (2016)
  - Total: 546
- Time zone: UTC+3:30 (IRST)

Rudak (Persian: رودک) (Note: Also romanized as Rūdak; also known as Roudbarak) is a village in Rudbar-e Qasran Rural District of Rudbar-e Qasran District in Shemiranat County, Tehran province, Iran. The Imamzadeh of Mohammad-Baqer, built during the reign of Fath-Ali Shah Qajar (r. 1797-1834), is located in Rudak.

== Demographics ==
=== Population ===
At the time of the 2006 National Census, the village's population was 767 in 214 households. The following census in 2011 counted 772 people in 258 households. The 2016 census measured the population of the village as 546 people in 182 households.

== Sources ==
- Encyclopaedia Iranica (2017). LAVĀSĀN.
