= Chahar Bagh, Shemiranat =

Village in Tehran province, Iran

Chahar Bagh Persian: چهارباغ
- Village
- Location within Iran
- Coordinates: 35°48′29″N 51°46′20″E
- Country: Iran
- Province: Tehran
- County: Shemiranat
- District: Lavasanat
- Rural District: Lavasan-e Bozorg

Population (2016)
  - Total: 97
- Time zone: UTC+3:30 (IRST)

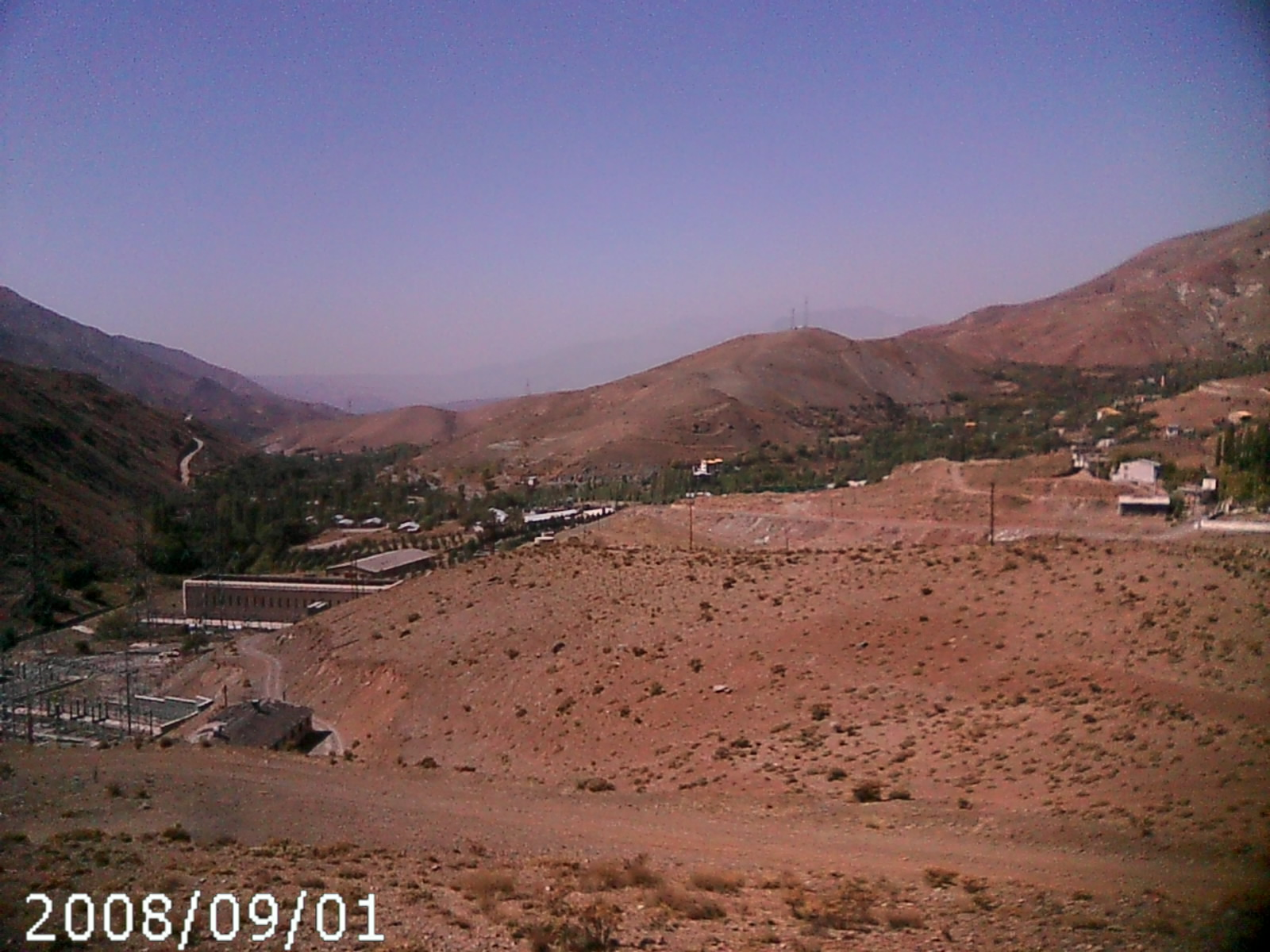
Chahar Bagh village

Chahar Bagh (Persian: چهارباغ) (Note: Also romanized as Chahār Bāgh and Chehārbāgh) is a village in Lavasan-e Bozorg Rural District of Lavasanat District in Shemiranat County, Tehran province, Iran.

== Demographics ==
=== Population ===
At the time of the 2006 National Census, the village's population was 84 in 24 households. The following census in 2011 counted 196 people in 65 households. The 2016 census measured the population of the village as 97 people in 29 households.
