= Garmabdar =

Village in Tehran province, Iran

Garmabdar Persian: گرمابدر
- Village
- Location within Iran
- Coordinates: 35°59′18″N 51°37′54″E
- Country: Iran
- Province: Tehran
- County: Shemiranat
- District: Rudbar-e Qasran
- Rural District: Rudbar-e Qasran
- Elevation: 2,450 m (8,040 ft)

Population (2016)
  - Total: 794
- Time zone: UTC+3:30 (IRST)

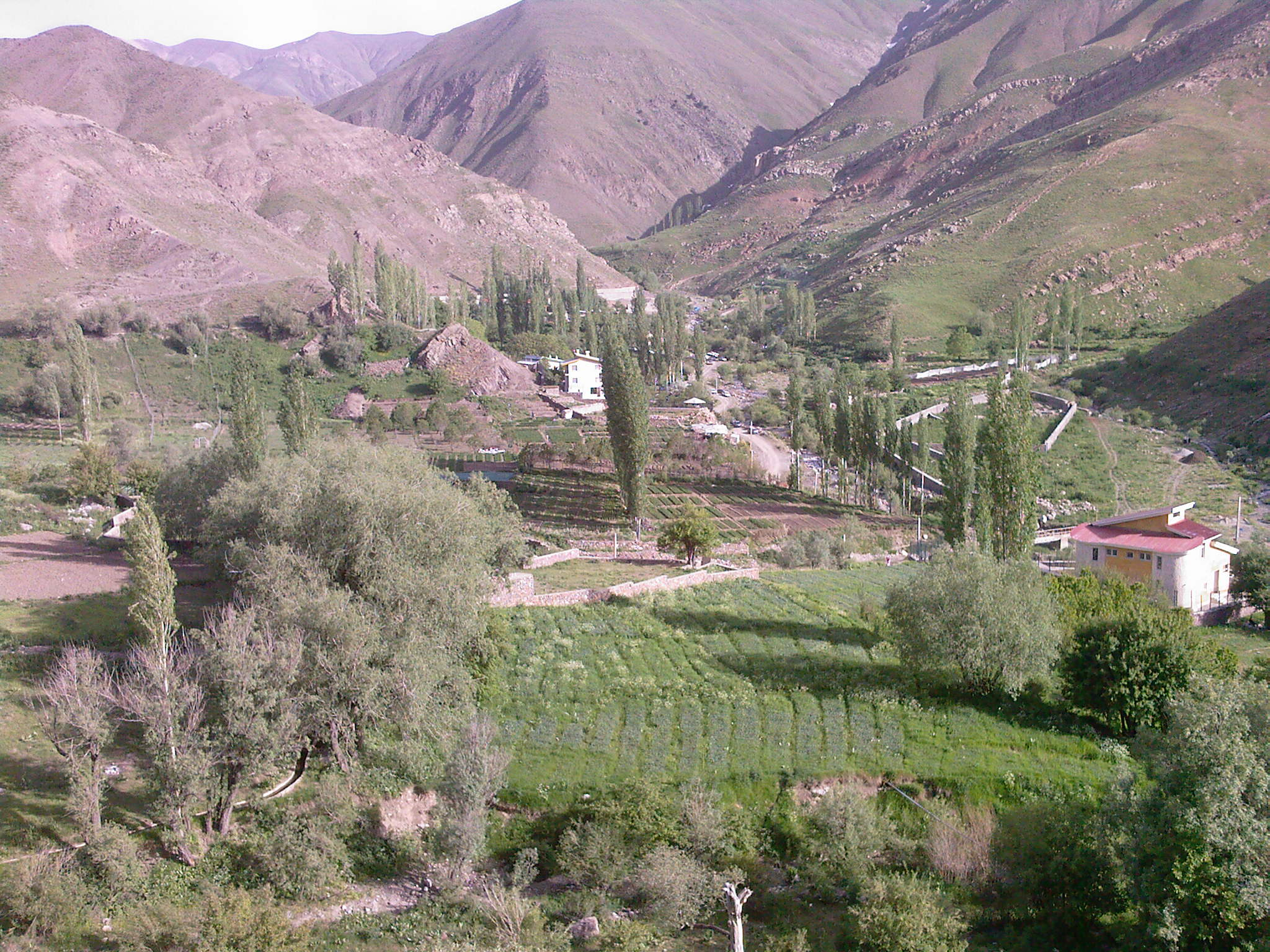
Garmabdar-lar road

Garmabdar (Persian: گرمابدر) (Note: Also romanized as Garmābadar and Garmābdar) is a village in Rudbar-e Qasran Rural District of Rudbar-e Qasran District in Shemiranat County, Tehran province, Iran.

== Demographics ==
=== Population ===
At the time of the 2006 National Census, the village's population was 289 in 90 households. The following census in 2011 counted 510 people in 171 households. The 2016 census measured the population of the village as 794 people in 271 households.
