= Qandil =

Qandil or Kandil (Arabic: قنديل, romanized: qindīl, 'candle') may refer to

- Kandil, five Islamic holy nights, related to the life of Muhammad

== Places ==
- Kandil, Iran (Persian: كندال), West Azerbaijan, Iran
- Qandil, Iran (Persian: قنديل), Fars Province, Iran
- Qandil Mountains, a mountainous area of southern Kurdistan

== People ==
- Abdel Hadi Kandil (1935–2019), Egyptian chemist and politician
- Ahmed Kandil (1923/1924–1950), Egyptian swimmer
- Ali Kandil (1920–1990s), Egyptian football referee
- Fouad Qandil (1944–2015), Egyptian novelist
- Hamdi Qandil (1936–2018), Egyptian journalist
- Hesham Qandil (born 1962), Prime Minister of Egypt 2012–2013
  - Qandil Cabinet
- Maor Kandil (born 1993), Israeli footballer
- Mohamed Mansi Qandil (born 1946), Egyptian author
- El-Sayed Kandil (1917–2000), Egyptian wrestler
- Yasmine Kandil, Egyptian-Canadian professor of applied drama

== See also ==
- Kandilli (disambiguation)
- Kandali (disambiguation)
- Kandeel, a lantern associated with Diwali
- Kandil simidi, a Turkish pastry
- Qandeel Baloch (1990–2016), murdered Pakistani model and actress
