= Rahatabad =

Rahatabad (Persian: راحت اباد) may refer to:

- Rahatabad, Isfahan
- Rahatabad, Tehran
