= Hajjiabad, Shemiranat =

Village in Tehran province, Iran

Hajjiabad Persian: امامه
- Village
- Location within Iran
- Coordinates: 35°52′38″N 51°32′05″E
- Country: Iran
- Province: Tehran
- County: Shemiranat
- District: Rudbar-e Qasran
- Rural District: Rudbar-e Qasran

Population (2016)
  - Total: 117
- Time zone: UTC+3:30 (IRST)

Hajjiabad (Persian: حاجي اباد) (Note: Also romanized as Hājī Ābād and Ḩājjīābād) is a village in, and the capital of, Rudbar-e Qasran Rural District in Rudbar-e Qasran District of Shemiranat County, Tehran province, Iran.

== Demographics ==
=== Population ===
At the time of the 2006 National Census, the village's population was 146 in 45 households. The following census in 2011 counted 191 people in 56 households. The 2016 census measured the population of the village as 117 people in 38 households.
