= Kand =

Kand (Persian: كَند) may refer to these villages in Tehran province, Iran:

- Kand-e Bala
- Kand-e Pain

== See also ==
- Kanda (disambiguation)
- Khand (disambiguation)
- Khanda (disambiguation)
- KAND, former radio station in Corsicana, Texas
- KIF1A Associated Neurological Disorder
