= Purzand-e Sofla =

Purzand-e Pain پورزند سفلی
- Village
- Location within Iran
- Coordinates: 35°47′00″N 51°47′37″E
- Country: Iran
- Province: Tehran
- County: Shemiranat
- Bakhsh: Lavasanat
- Rural District: Lavasan-e Bozorg

Population (2006)
  - Total: 11
- Time zone: UTC+3:30 (IRST)
  - Summer (DST): UTC+4:30 (IRDT)

Purzand-e Pain (Persian: پورزند سفلی, also Romanized as Pūrzand-e Soflá, Būrzand-e Soflá, and Pūrzand-e Pā'īn) is a village in Lavasan-e Bozorg Rural District, Lavasanat District, Shemiranat County, Tehran Province, Iran. At the 2006 census, its population was 11, in 4 families.
