= Kalan, Tehran =

Village in Tehran province, Iran

Kalan Persian: كلان
- Village
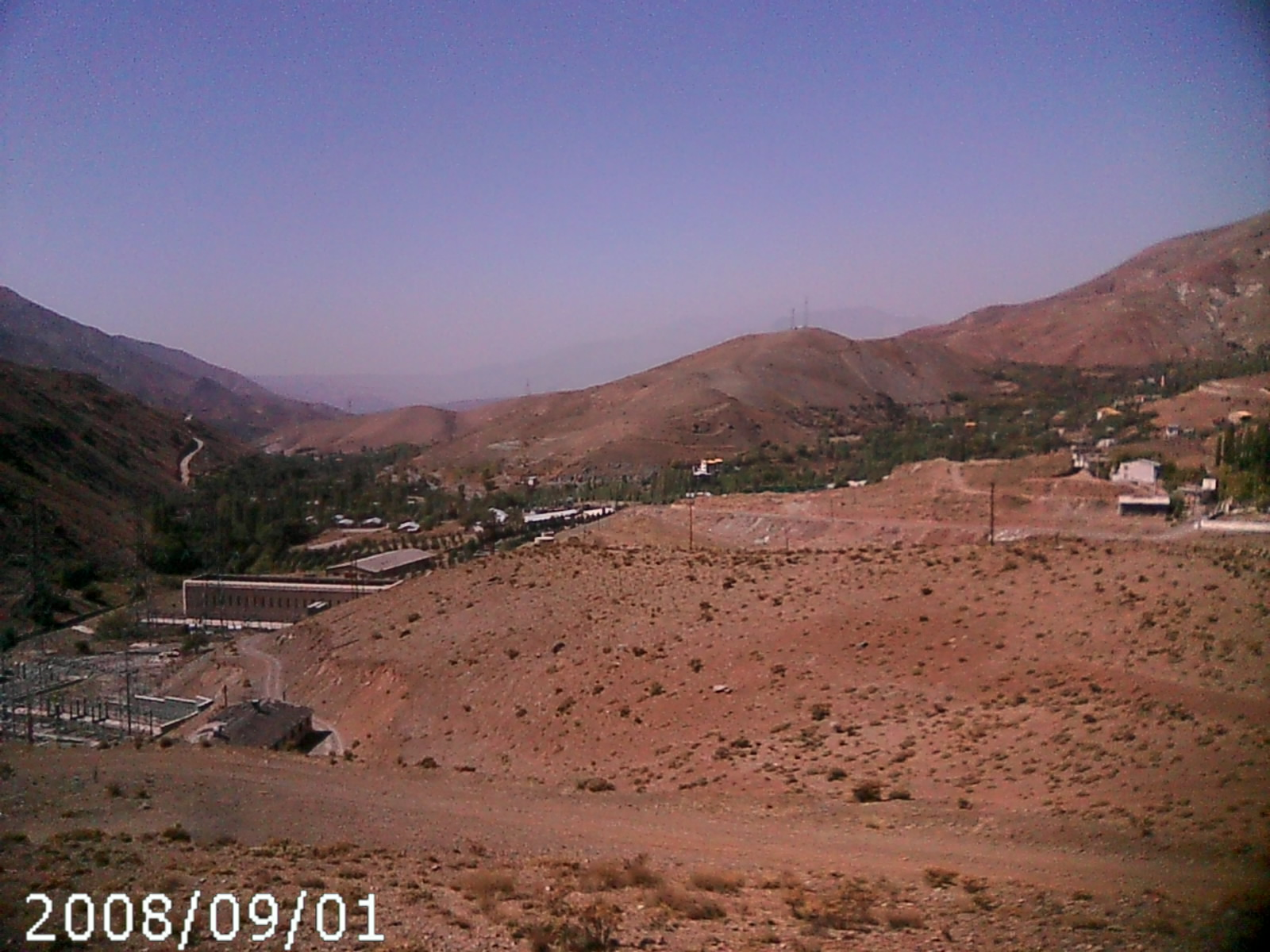

- Location within Iran
- Coordinates: 35°48′37″N 51°47′28″E
- Country: Iran
- Province: Tehran
- County: Shemiranat
- District: Lavasanat
- Rural District: Lavasan-e Bozorg
- Elevation: 2,050 m (6,730 ft)

Population (2016)
  - Total: 463
- Time zone: UTC+3:30 (IRST)

Kalan (Persian: كلان) (Note: Also romanized as Kalān) is a village in Lavasan-e Bozorg Rural District of Lavasanat District in Shemiranat County, Tehran province, Iran.

== Demographics ==
=== Population ===
At the time of the 2006 National Census, the village's population was 546 in 142 households. The following census in 2011 counted 618 people in 176 households. The 2016 census measured the population of the village as 463 people in 148 households.
