= Jirud, Tehran =

Neighborhood in Tehran province, Iran

Jirud Persian: جيرود
- Neighborhood
- Location within Iran
- Coordinates: 35°59′51″N 51°28′48″E
- Country: Iran
- Province: Tehran
- County: Shemiranat
- District: Rudbar-e Qasran
- City: Shemshak

Population (2011)
  - Total: 109
- Time zone: UTC+3:30 (IRST)

Jirud (Persian: جيرود) (Note: Also romanized as Jīr Rūd, Jīrrūd, and Jīrūd) is a neighborhood in the city of Shemshak in Rudbar-e Qasran District of Shemiranat County, Tehran province, Iran.

== Demographics ==
=== Population ===
At the time of the 2006 National Census, Jirud's population was 81 in 28 households, when it was a village in Rudbar-e Qasran Rural District. The following census in 2011 counted 109 people in 34 households.

In 2012, the villages of Darband Sar, Darrud, Jirud, Sefidestan, Shemshak-e Bala, and Shemshak-e Pain merged to establish the city of Shemshak.
