= Kond-e Sofla =

Kond-e Sofla كندسفلي
- village
- Location within Iran
- Coordinates: 35°51′53″N 51°38′49″E
- Country: Iran
- Province: Tehran
- County: Shemiranat
- Bakhsh: Lavasanat
- Rural District: Lavasan-e Kuchak
- Elevation: 1,950 m (6,400 ft)

Population (2006)
  - Total: 122
- Time zone: UTC+3:30 (IRST)
  - Summer (DST): UTC+4:30 (IRDT)

Kond-e Sofla (Persian: كندسفلي, also romanized as Kond-e Soflá; also known as Kond-e Pā’īn and Kand-e Pā’īn) is a village in Lavasan-e Kuchak Rural District, Lavasanat District, Shemiranat County, Tehran Province, Iran. At the 2006 census, its population was 122, in 30 families.
