= Ab Nik =

Ab Nik (Persian: ابنيك or اب نيك) may refer to:

- Ab Nik, Izeh, Khuzestan Province (اب نيك)
- Ab Nik, Lali, Khuzestan Province (اب نيك)
- Ab Nik, Tehran (ابنيك)
