= Rasanan =

Village in Tehran province, Iran

Rasanan Persian: رسنان
- Village
- Location within Iran
- Coordinates: 35°48′09″N 51°45′21″E
- Country: Iran
- Province: Tehran
- County: Shemiranat
- District: Lavasanat
- Rural District: Lavasan-e Bozorg
- Highest elevation: 1,920 m (6,300 ft)
- Lowest elevation: 1,880 m (6,170 ft)

Population (2016)
  - Total: 574
- Time zone: UTC+3:30 (IRST)

Rasanan (Persian: رسنان) (Note: Also romanized as Rasanān) is a village in Lavasan-e Bozorg Rural District of Lavasanat District in Shemiranat County, Tehran province, Iran.

== Demographics ==
=== Population ===
At the time of the 2006 National Census, the village's population was 375 in 111 households. The following census in 2011 counted 363 people in 117 households. The 2016 census measured the population of the village as 574 people in 193 households.

== Overview ==
The village is located 11 km from Tehran road to Damavand and is 14 km from Lavasan city center of Lavasanat district. In the spring and summer, the weather is calm and cool, and the climate is cold in fall and winter.

The villagers of Rasanan, like other villages in the region, speak in ancient Persian language. Rasanan is close to the capital and since old times, people of the village had two houses; one in Tehran for the winter and one for the remainder of the year in Rasanan.

On the right is Kalakdar Farm. The farm belongs to the two original families of the region, the Hadian and Mohammadian families. These families have endowed the farm for Imam Hussein for rural development. Rasanan has a primary school, which was donated by the late Ali Asghar Mohammadian and was built more than 55 years ago.

According to the documents and especially the endowment letter of the Kalakdar farm, a group of Hadian families is from the Zand family and the sons of Haj Mohammad Hassan Khan and Suleiman Shahsavari. During the massacre of their family, in the reign of Sultan Agha Mohammad Khan Qajar, they had secretly emigrated from Shiraz to Rasanan, and had taken some interesting and traditional architecture in their homes. Since then the hills and mountains have eroded and the village has been redeveloped.
