= Bagh Gol, Tehran =

Bagh Gol باغ گل
- Village
- Location within Iran
- Coordinates: 35°54′33″N 51°29′47″E
- Country: Iran
- Province: Tehran
- County: Shemiranat
- Bakhsh: Rudbar-e Qasran
- Rural District: Rudbar-e Qasran

Population (2006)
  - Total: 92
- Time zone: UTC+3:30 (IRST)
  - Summer (DST): UTC+4:30 (IRDT)

Bagh Gol (Persian: باغ گل, also Romanized as Bāgh Gol and Bāgh-e Gol) is a village in Rudbar-e Qasran Rural District, Rudbar-e Qasran District, Shemiranat County, Tehran Province, Iran. At the 2006 census, its population was 92, in 31 families.

Bagh Gol is located North of Tehran in the Alborz mountains range, just behind Tochal mountain. It takes about 40 minutes from the northern part of Tehran to get there by a road along the Jajerud river. It has a pleasant weather, especially in summer time when the Tehran weather reaches to over 100 F in some days. Walnut, cherry, apple, apricot, berries and many other fruits are produced at Bagh Gol. In recent years, orchard gardens are changing to summer homes by non local residents rapidly.
