= Niknam Deh, Tehran =

Village in Tehran province, Iran

Niknam Deh Persian: نيكنامده
- Village
- Location within Iran
- Coordinates: 35°48′59″N 51°43′58″E
- Country: Iran
- Province: Tehran
- County: Shemiranat
- District: Lavasanat
- Rural District: Lavasan-e Bozorg
- Highest elevation: 1,900 m (6,200 ft)
- Lowest elevation: 1,780 m (5,840 ft)

Population (2016)
  - Total: 3,441
- Time zone: UTC+3:30 (IRST)

Niknam Deh (Persian: نيكنامده) (Note: Also romanized as Nīknām Deh) is a village in Lavasan-e Bozorg Rural District of Lavasanat District in Shemiranat County, Tehran province, Iran.

== Demographics ==
=== Population ===
At the time of the 2006 National Census, the village's population was 1,739 in 506 households. The following census in 2011 counted 1,297 people in 419 households. The 2016 census measured the population of the village as 3,441 people in 1,145 households. It was the most populous village in its rural district.
