= Rudbar-e Qasran =

Rudbar-e Qasran (Persian: رودبارقصران) may refer to:

- Rudbar-e Qasran District
- Rudbar-e Qasran Rural District
