= Barg-e Jahan =

Village in Tehran province, Iran

Barg-e Jahan Persian: برگ‌ جهان
- Village
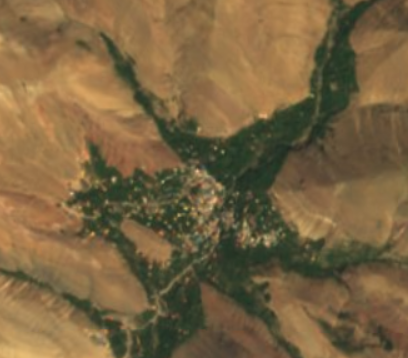
- Barg-e Jahan in 2020

- Location within Iran
- Coordinates: 35°50′36″N 51°44′01″E
- Country: Iran
- Province: Tehran
- County: Shemiranat
- District: Lavasanat
- Rural District: Lavasan-e Kuchak

Population (2016)
  - Total: 629
- Time zone: UTC+3:30 (IRST)
- Website: bargejahan.ir

Barg-e Jahan (Persian: برگ‌‌ جهان) (Note: Also romanized as Barg-e Jahān; also known as Bafkejan and Bafkijan; English: Leaf of the World) is a village in Lavasan-e Kuchak Rural District of Lavasanat District in Shemiranat County, Tehran province, Iran.

The village enjoys cool summers and is used as a recreational village for those living in Tehran, especially in the summer. Most of its region is covered by fruit orchards including walnuts, apples, cherries, sour cherries, plums, and apricots.

== Demographics ==
=== Population ===
At the time of the 2006 National Census, the village's population was 378 in 116 households. The following census in 2011 counted 577 people in 202 households. The 2016 census measured the population of the village as 629 people in 226 households.
