= Ammameh Castle =

Castle in Tehran Province, Iran

- قلعه امامه
- Interactive map of the Ammameh Castle area

General information
- Type: Castle
- Location: Shemiranat County, Iran
- Coordinates: 35.91481°N 51.59836°E

Ammameh Castle (Persian: قلعه امامه) or Maziar Castle (Persian: قلعه مازیار) is a historical castle located in Ammameh village, Shemiranat County, Tehran Province, Iran. The castle dates back to the Ziyarid dynasty.
