= Ruteh =

Village in Tehran province, Iran

Ruteh Persian: روته
- Village
- Location within Iran
- Coordinates: 35°57′48″N 51°32′34″E
- Country: Iran
- Province: Tehran
- County: Shemiranat
- District: Rudbar-e Qasran
- Rural District: Rudbar-e Qasran
- Elevation: 2,200 m (7,200 ft)

Population (2016)
  - Total: 458
- Time zone: UTC+3:30 (IRST)

Ruteh (Persian: روته) (Note: Also romanized as Rūteh; also known as Roteh and Rūdeh) is a village in Rudbar-e Qasran Rural District of Rudbar-e Qasran District in Shemiranat County, Tehran province, Iran.

== Demographics ==
=== Population ===
At the time of the 2006 National Census, the village's population was 508 in 153 households. The following census in 2011 counted 485 people in 147 households. The 2016 census measured the population of the village as 458 people in 180 households.
