= Purzand =

Purzand (Persian: پورزند) may refer to:

- Purzand-e Sofla
- Purzand-e Vosta
