= Ira, Tehran =

Ira ايرا
- village
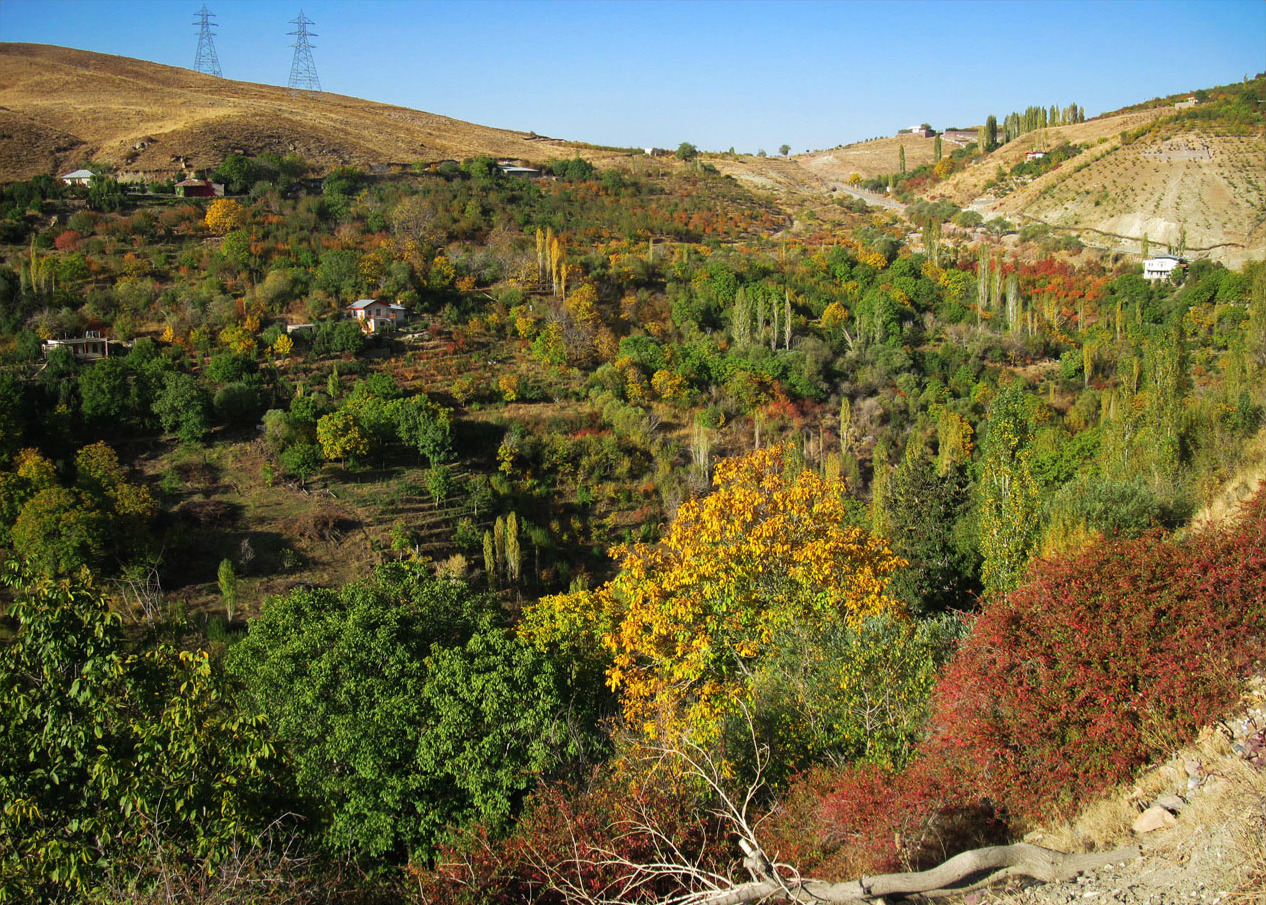

- Location within Iran
- Coordinates: 35°48′29″N 51°50′27″E
- Country: Iran
- Province: Tehran
- County: Shemiranat
- Bakhsh: Lavasanat
- Rural District: Lavasan-e Bozorg
- Elevation: 2,100–2,200 m (6,900–7,200 ft)

Population (2016)
  - Total: 79
- Time zone: UTC+3:30 (IRST)

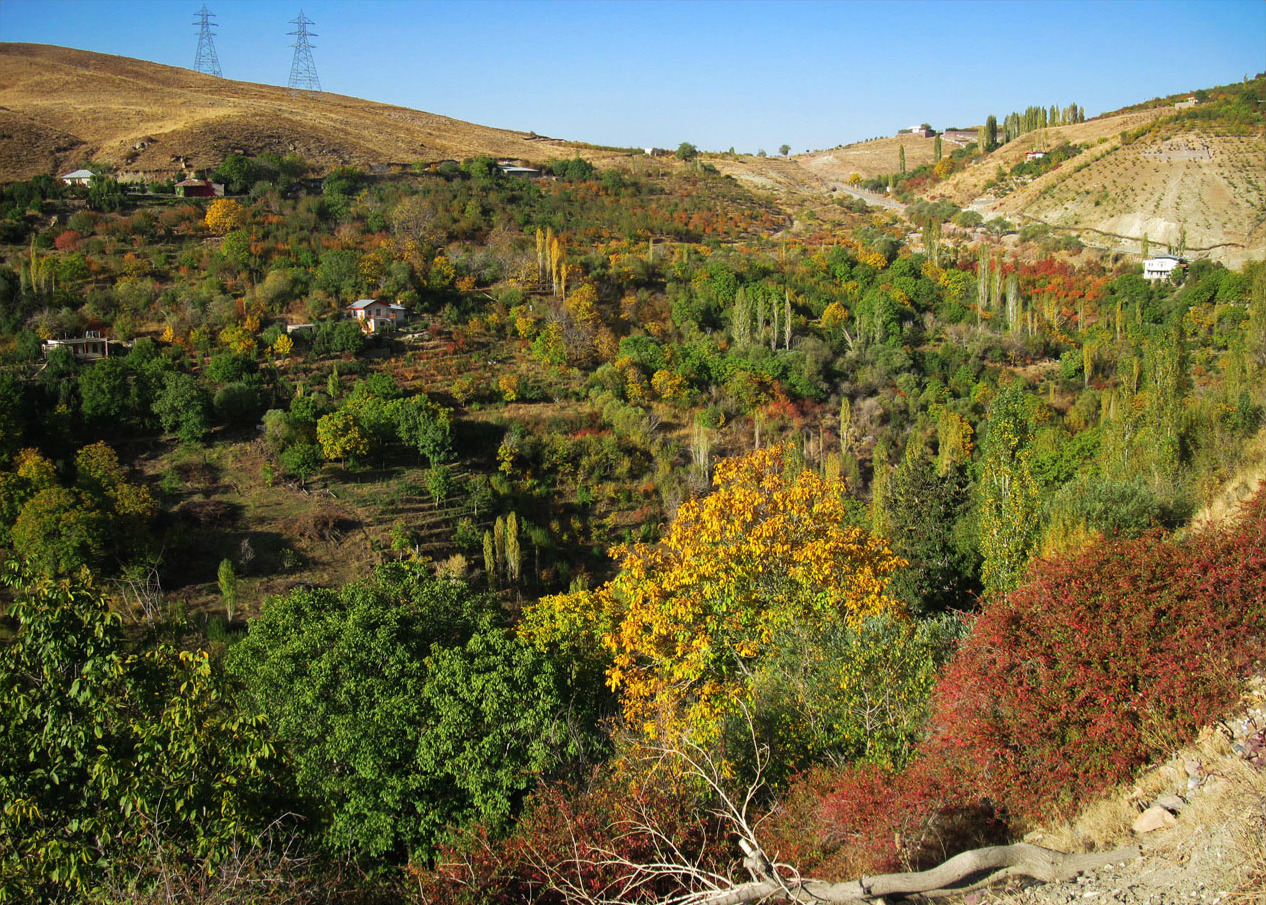

Ira (Persian: ايرا, also Romanized as Īrā) is a village in Lavasan-e Bozorg Rural District, Lavasanat District, Shemiranat County, Tehran Province, Iran. At the 2016 census, its population was 79, in 29 families. Down from 106 people in 2006.

The natives of Ira, alike the rest of the Lavasanat district, are of Caspian origin, and the local dialect or vernacular of the natives is a mix of Persian and Caspian. In the village of Ira (as well as Veskara), this vernacular approaches Mazandarani.

== Sources ==
- Encyclopaedia Iranica (2017). LAVĀSĀN.
