= Kusur =

Kusur may refer to:

- Kusur, Republic of Dagestan
- Kusur, Zaqatala, Azerbaijan
- Kusur, Mawal, Pune, Maharashtra, India
- Kusur, Vaibhavwadi, Sindhudurg, Maharashtra, India

== See also ==
- Kasur (disambiguation)
