= Hanzak =

Village in Tehran province, Iran

Hanzak Persian: هنزك
- Village
- Location within Iran
- Coordinates: 35°50′32″N 51°40′34″E
- Country: Iran
- Province: Tehran
- County: Shemiranat
- District: Lavasanat
- Rural District: Lavasan-e Kuchak
- Elevation: 1,900 m (6,200 ft)

Population (2016)
  - Total: 720
- Time zone: UTC+3:30 (IRST)

Hanzak (Persian: هنزك) (Note: Also romanized as Henzak; also known as Hinzak) is a village in Lavasan-e Kuchak Rural District of Lavasanat District in Shemiranat County, Tehran province, Iran.

== Demographics ==
=== Population ===
At the time of the 2006 National Census, the village's population was 168 in 53 households. The following census in 2011 counted 453 people in 152 households. The 2016 census measured the population of the village as 720 people in 254 households.
