= Zayegan =

Village in Tehran province, Iran

Zayegan Persian: زايگان
- Village
- Location within Iran
- Coordinates: 35°58′20″N 51°35′11″E
- Country: Iran
- Province: Tehran
- County: Shemiranat
- District: Rudbar-e Qasran
- Rural District: Rudbar-e Qasran

Population (2016)
  - Total: 505
- Time zone: UTC+3:30 (IRST)

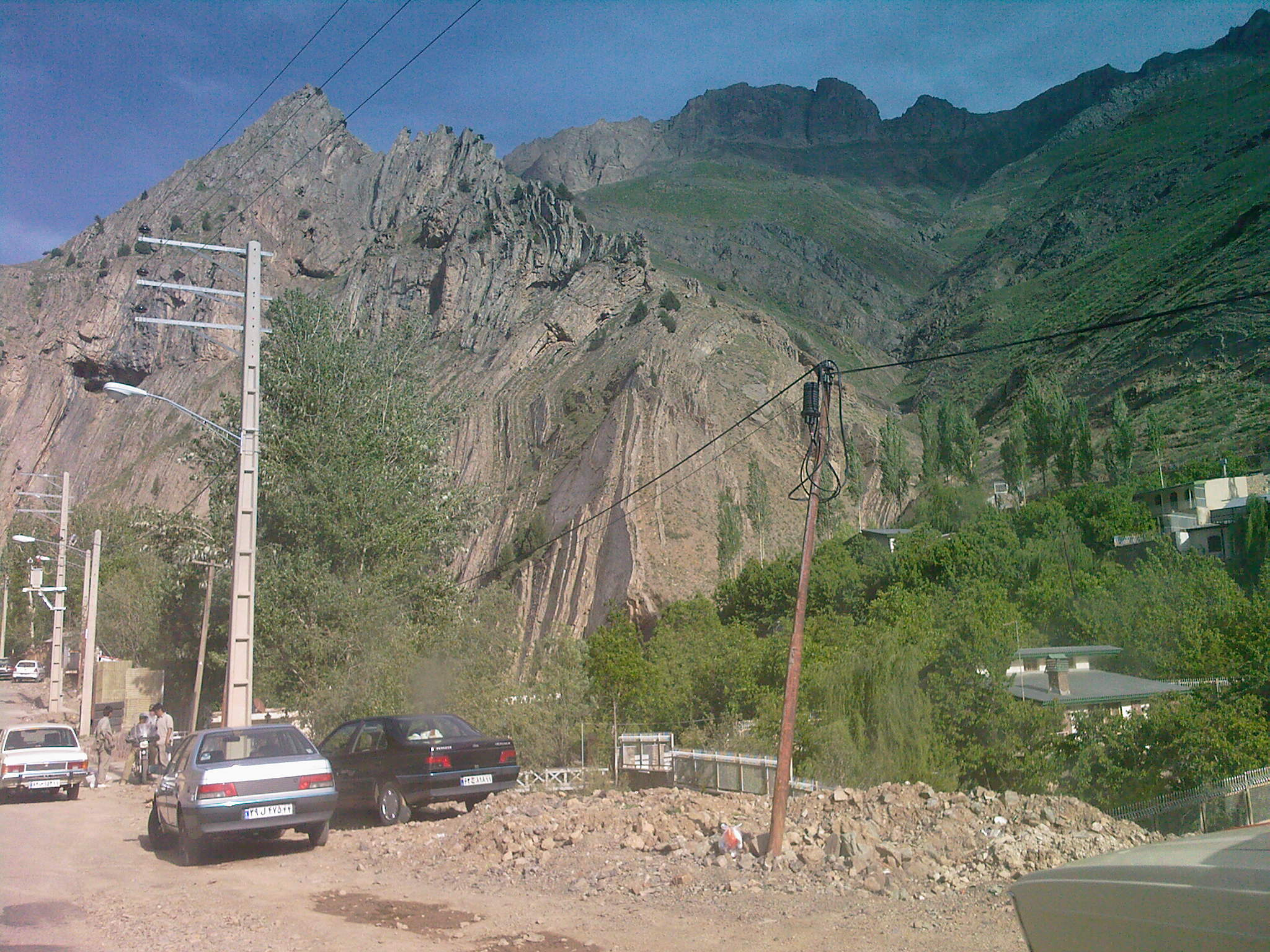
Nice Rock in garmabdar-lar road, Zayegan

Zayegan (Persian: زايگان) (Note: Also romanized as Zāyegān and Zāygān) is a village in Rudbar-e Qasran Rural District of Rudbar-e Qasran District in Shemiranat County, Tehran province, Iran.

== Demographics ==
=== Population ===
At the time of the 2006 National Census, the village's population was 425 in 130 households. The following census in 2011 counted 656 people in 216 households. The 2016 census measured the population of the village as 505 people in 226 households.
