= Alayin, Shemiranat =

Village in Tehran province, Iran

Alayin Persian: علائين
- Village
- Location within Iran
- Coordinates: 35°48′30″N 51°48′03″E
- Country: Iran
- Province: Tehran
- County: Shemiranat
- District: Lavasanat
- Rural District: Lavasan-e Bozorg

Population (2016)
  - Total: 99
- Time zone: UTC+3:30 (IRST)

A home in Alayin

Alayin (Persian: علائين) (Note: Also romanized as Alaeen, Alain, and ‘Alā’īn) is a village in Lavasan-e Bozorg Rural District of Lavasanat District in Shemiranat County, Tehran province, Iran.

== Demographics ==
=== Population ===
At the time of the 2006 National Census, the village's population was 99 in 34 households. The following census in 2011 counted 129 people in 48 households. The 2016 census measured the population of the village as 99 people in 39 households.
