= Ahar, Tehran =

Village in Tehran province, Iran

Ahar Persian: آهار
- Village
- Location within Iran
- Coordinates: 35°56′10″N 51°27′40″E
- Country: Iran
- Province: Tehran
- County: Shemiranat
- District: Rudbar-e Qasran
- Rural District: Rudbar-e Qasran
- Elevation: 2,100 m (6,900 ft)

Population (2016)
  - Total: 583
- Time zone: UTC+3:30 (IRST)

Ahar (Persian: آهار) (Note: Also romanized as Āhār) is a village in Rudbar-e Qasran Rural District of Rudbar-e Qasran District in Shemiranat County, Tehran province, Iran.

== Demographics ==
=== Population ===
At the time of the 2006 National Census, the village's population was 302 in 232 households. The following census in 2011 counted 1,005 people in 364 households. The 2016 census measured the population of the village as 583 people in 214 households.
