= Kandalan =

Kandalan or Kondelan may refer to:

- Kondelan, Isfahan, a village in Isfahan province, Iran
- Kandalan, Kurdistan, a village in Kurdistan province, Iran

== See also ==
- Kandala (disambiguation)
- Kandal (disambiguation)
- Konidela (disambiguation)
- Kandali (disambiguation)
- Kandel (disambiguation)
- Kanda (disambiguation)
