= Khanda =

Khanda may refer to:

== Places ==
- Khanda, Sonipat, a large historical village in Sonipat district of Haryana, India
- Khanda, Jind, a village in Jind district of Haryana, India
- Khanda Kheri, a village in Hansi Tehsil of Hisar district of Haryana, India
- Khanda, Agra, a village in Agra district of Uttar Pradesh, India
- Khanda (river), Yakutia, Russia

== Other uses ==
- Khanda (Sikh symbol)
- Khanda (sword)

== See also ==
- Khand (disambiguation)
- Kand (disambiguation)
- Kanda (disambiguation)
- Kandha (disambiguation)
- Khandan (disambiguation)
