= Ab Nik, Tehran =

Village in Tehran province, Iran

Ab Nik Persian: ابنيك
- Village
- Location within Iran
- Coordinates: 35°59′21″N 51°37′06″E
- Country: Iran
- Province: Tehran
- County: Shemiranat
- District: Rudbar-e Qasran
- Rural District: Rudbar-e Qasran

Population (2016)
  - Total: 512
- Time zone: UTC+3:30 (IRST)

Ab Nik (Persian: ابنيك) (Note: Also romanized as Āb Nīk and Ābnīk; also known as Abnak) is a village in Rudbar-e Qasran Rural District of Rudbar-e Qasran District in Shemiranat County, Tehran province, Iran.

== Demographics ==
=== Population ===
At the time of the 2006 National Census, the village's population was 274 in 78 households. The following census in 2011 counted 535 people in 158 households. The 2016 census measured the population of the village as 512 people in 179 households.
