= Kui language =

Kui language may refer to:

- Kui language (India), a Dravidian language of eastern India (Odisha and Andhra Pradesh) spoken by the Khonds
- Kui language (Indonesia), an Alor-Pantar language of Indonesia
- Kuy language, an Austroasiatic language of Thailand

== See also ==
- Kui (disambiguation)
- Khond language (disambiguation)
- Kuvi language, another Dravidian language of India
