= Purzand-e Vosta =

Village in Tehran province, Iran

Purzand-e Vosta Persian: پورزند وسطی
- Village
- Location within Iran
- Coordinates: 35°47′08″N 51°48′03″E
- Country: Iran
- Province: Tehran
- County: Shemiranat
- District: Lavasanat
- Rural District: Lavasan-e Bozorg

Population (2016)
  - Total: 231
- Time zone: UTC+3:30 (IRST)

Purzand-e Vasat (Persian: پورزند وسطی) (Note: Also romanized as Pūrzand-e Vosţá; also known as Būrzand-e Vosţá and Pūrzand-e Vasaţ) is a village in Lavasan-e Bozorg Rural District of Lavasanat District in Shemiranat County, Tehran province, Iran.

== Demographics ==
=== Population ===
At the time of the 2006 National Census, the village's population was 35 in eight households. The following census in 2011 counted 44 people in 17 households. The 2016 census measured the population of the village as 231 people in 94 households.
