= Lalun (disambiguation) =

Lalun may refer to:

- Lalun, a thoroughbred racehorse and broodmare who won the 1955 Kentucky Oaks
- Lalun, Iran, a village near Tehran, Iran
- Lalun, Philippines, a populated place in Ilocos Norte
- Lalun Formation, a stratigraphic formation in the early Cambrian Sauk sequence
