= Proochthoi =

Coastal town of ancient Bithynia

Coordinates: 41°04′27″N 29°03′30″E

Proochthoi or Brochthoi was a coastal town of ancient Bithynia located on the Bosphorus.

Its site is tentatively located south of Kandilli in Asiatic Turkey.
