= Kandha =

Kandha may refer to:

- Khond people, an ethnic group of India
- Kandha Gauda, a people of Odisha, India
- Kandha, Iran, a village in Iran

== See also ==
- Khanda (disambiguation)
- Khand (disambiguation)
- Kanda (disambiguation)
