= KXS =

KXS may refer to:

- kxs, the ISO 639-3 code for Kangjia language
- Kinaxis, the TSX code KXS
- Kasur Tehsil railway station, the station code KXS
