= Lalan, Tehran =

Village in Tehran province, Iran

Lalan Persian: لالان
- Village
- Location within Iran
- Coordinates: 35°59′34″N 51°34′41″E
- Country: Iran
- Province: Tehran
- County: Shemiranat
- District: Rudbar-e Qasran
- Rural District: Rudbar-e Qasran
- Elevation: 2,380–2,440 m (7,810–8,010 ft)

Population (2016)
  - Total: 1,135
- Time zone: UTC+3:30 (IRST)

Lalan (Persian: لالان) (Note: Also romanized as Lālān; also known as Lālūn) is a village in Rudbar-e Qasran Rural District of Rudbar-e Qasran District in Shemiranat County, Tehran province, Iran.

== Demographics ==
=== Population ===
At the time of the 2006 National Census, the village's population was 665 in 183 households. The following census in 2011 counted 836 people in 255 households. The 2016 census measured the population of the village as 1,135 people in 369 households.
