= Afjeh =

Village in Tehran province, Iran

Afjeh Persian: افجه
- Village
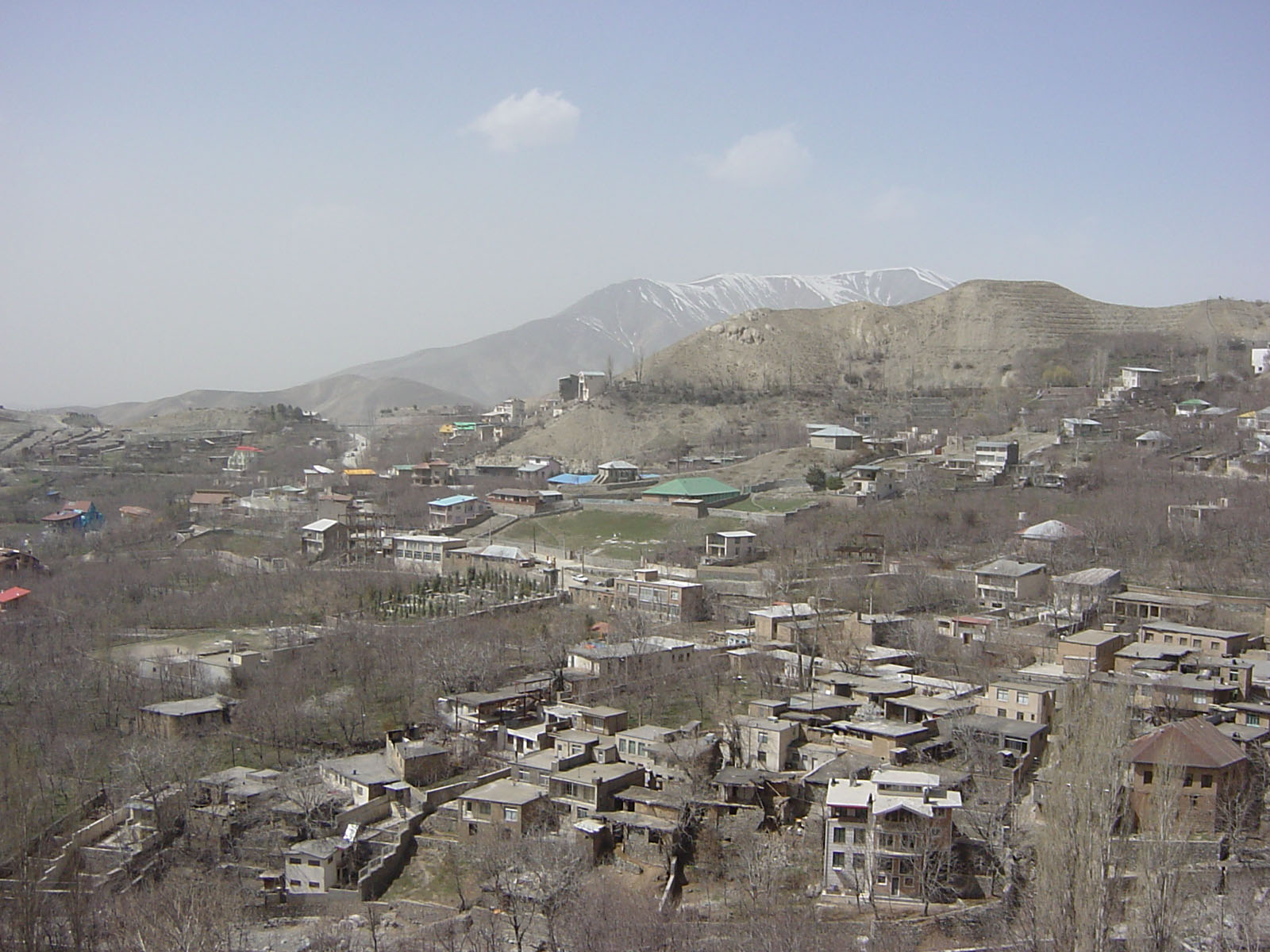
- The village of Afjeh

- Location within Iran
- Coordinates: 35°51′34″N 51°41′25″E
- Country: Iran
- Province: Tehran
- County: Shemiranat
- District: Lavasanat
- Rural District: Lavasan-e Kuchak
- Elevation: 2,050 m (6,730 ft)

Population (2016)
  - Total: 1,257
- Time zone: UTC+3:30 (IRST)

Afjeh (Persian: افجه) (Note: Also known as Afche, Afcheh, and Efje) is a village in, and the capital of, Lavasan-e Kuchak Rural District in Lavasanat District of Shemiranat County, Tehran province, Iran.

== Demographics ==
=== Population ===
At the time of the 2006 National Census, the village's population was 685 in 186 households. The following census in 2011 counted 1,079 people in 341 households. The 2016 census measured the population of the village as 1,257 people in 427 households. It was the most populous village in its rural district.
