= Kasur (disambiguation) =

Kasur is a city in Pakistan.

Kasur may also refer to:

- Kasur District, a district of Punjab (Pakistan).
- Kasur Tehsil, a tehsil of district Kasur.
- Kasur station:
  - Kasur Junction railway station, a railway station situated in Kasur region.
  - Kasur Tehsil railway station, a railway station in Kasur tehsil.

== See also ==
- Kasuri (disambiguation)
- Kusur (disambiguation)
- Kasoor, 2001 Indian film directed by Vikram Bhatt
