= Abnak =

Abnak may refer to:

- Abnak, Iran
- Abnak Records
