= Kond-e Olya =

Village in Tehran province, Iran

Kond-e Olya Persian: كندعليا
- Village
- Location within Iran
- Coordinates: 35°52′23″N 51°39′14″E
- Country: Iran
- Province: Tehran
- County: Shemiranat
- District: Lavasanat
- Rural District: Lavasan-e Kuchak
- Elevation: 2,000–2,100 m (6,600–6,900 ft)

Population (2016)
  - Total: 1,119
- Time zone: UTC+3:30 (IRST)

Kond-e Olya (Persian: كندعليا) (Note: Also romanized as Kond-e ‘Olyā; also known as Kand-e Bālā and Kond-e Bālā) is a village in Lavasan-e Kuchak Rural District of Lavasanat District in Shemiranat County, Tehran province, Iran.

== Demographics ==
=== Population ===
At the time of the 2006 National Census, the village's population was 655 in 187 households. The following census in 2011 counted 1,492 people in 501 households. The 2016 census measured the population of the village as 1,119 people in 368 households.
