= Jirud =

Jirud or Jirrud or Jir Rud (Persian: جيرود) may refer to:

- Jirud, Tehran
- Jayrud, a town in southern Syria
