= Jayammu Nischayammu Raa =

Jayammu Nischayammu Raa (lit. 'Victory is Certain' in Telugu) may refer to:

- Jayammu Nischayammu Raa (1989 film), an Indian film directed by Jandhyala starring Rajendra Prasad, Sumalatha and Chandra Mohan
- Jayammu Nischayammu Raa (2016 film), an Indian film directed and produced by Shiva Raj Kanumuri starring Srinivasa Reddy and Poorna
