= Rahatabad, Tehran =

Village in Tehran province, Iran

Rahatabad Persian: راحت اباد
- Village
- Location within Iran
- Coordinates: 35°53′46″N 51°37′02″E
- Country: Iran
- Province: Tehran
- County: Shemiranat
- District: Lavasanat
- Rural District: Lavasan-e Kuchak
- Elevation: 2,400 m (7,900 ft)

Population (2016)
  - Total: 384
- Time zone: UTC+3:30 (IRST)

Rahatabad (Persian: راحت اباد) (Note: Also romanized as Rāḩatābād) is a village in Lavasan-e Kuchak Rural District of Lavasanat District in Shemiranat County, Tehran province, Iran.

== Demographics ==
=== Population ===
At the time of the 2006 National Census, the village's population was 16 in five households. The following census in 2011 counted 309 people in 90 households. The 2016 census measured the population of the village as 384 people in 114 households.
