= Lavasan-e Bozorg =

Village in Tehran province, Iran

Lavasan-e Bozorg Persian: لواسان بزرگ
- Village
- Location within Iran
- Coordinates: 35°49′32″N 51°46′57″E
- Country: Iran
- Province: Tehran
- County: Shemiranat
- District: Lavasanat
- Rural District: Lavasan-e Bozorg
- Elevation: 2,150 m (7,050 ft)

Population (2016)
  - Total: 937
- Time zone: UTC+3:30 (IRST)

Lavasan-e Bozorg (Persian: لواسان بزرگ) (Note: Also romanized as Lavāsān Bozorg and Lavāsān-e Bozorg) is a village in, and the capital of, Lavasan-e Bozorg Rural District in Lavasanat District of Shemiranat County, Tehran province, Iran.

== Demographics ==
=== Population ===
At the time of the 2006 National Census, the village's population was 483 in 148 households. The following census in 2011 counted 971 people in 315 households. The 2016 census measured the population of the village as 937 people in 320 households.
