= Nagesh Banell =

Indian cinematographer

- Born: Konidela, Andhra Pradesh, India
- Occupation: Cinematographer
- Years active: 2012–present

Nagesh Banell is an Indian cinematographer who works in Telugu cinema. His debut feature film was Pelli Choopulu (2016) and later worked in films such as Arjun Reddy (2017) and Masooda (2022).

== Early life and career ==
Nagesh Banell was born in Konidela village of Kurnool district in Andhra Pradesh, India. He began his career in short films and worked in Rana Daggubati's production company Spirit Media. He has also worked on the digital intermediate and other post-production processes for various films. He had associated with filmmaker Tharun Bhascker for four or five short films including Sainma (2015).

Although Jayammu Nischayammu Raa (2016) was his first signed film, his immediate next signed film Pelli Choopulu (2016) was released first, thus making his debut feature film. He was next hired for Arjun Reddy (2017), he shot beard and Italy portions which has around 01H30M in the released film. Later came out of the project due to creative differences and replaced with Raj Thota. He received wide recognition for the 2022 supernatural horror film Masooda.

== Filmography ==
Year	Title	Notes	Ref.
2012	Junun	Short film	
2015	Sainma	Short film	
2016	Pelli Choopulu	Debut feature film	
2016	Jayammu Nischayammu Raa		
2017	Fashion Designer s/o Ladies Tailor		
2017	Arjun Reddy	Shot 40% of the film	
2019	1947 Two Soldiers	Short film; Nominated–Calcutta International Cult Films Festival Best Cinematographer	
2020	Pressure Cooker		
2021	Akshara		
2021	Merise Merise		
2021	Anubhavinchu Raja		
2022	Masooda		
2026	Honey		
2026	KJQ: King Jackie Queen		

=== Television ===
Year	Title	Network
2022	Aha Naa Pellanta	ZEE5
