= Kandel (disambiguation) =

Kandel is a town in Rhineland-Palatinate, Germany

Kandel may also refer to:

- Kandel (Verbandsgemeinde), a municipality in Germany
- Kandel (mountain), a mountain in the Black Forest, Germany
- Kandel (surname), including a list of persons with the name
- Kandel, Iran, a village in South Khorasan Province, Iran

== See also ==
- Kandle (disambiguation)
- Candel (disambiguation)
- Candle (disambiguation)
- Kandal (disambiguation)
- Kandala (disambiguation)
- Kandalan (disambiguation)
- Konidela (disambiguation)
- Kandali (disambiguation)
- Kanda (disambiguation)
