= Kasuri (disambiguation) =

Kasuri is the name of a textile technique.

Kasuri may also refer to anyone who hails from the city of Kasur in Pakistan:

- Ahmad Raza Khan Kasuri (b. 1940), a Pakistani politician and lawyer, son of Muhammad Ahmed Khan Kasuri
- Fauzia Kasuri (b. 1952), a Pakistani politician and women's activist
- Khurshid Mahmud Kasuri (b. 1941), a Pakistani politician who served as the Foreign Affairs minister
- Mahmud Ali Kasuri (1910–1987), a Pakistani politician, lawyer and human rights activist
- Nawab Muhammad Ahmed Khan Kasuri (1922–1974), Pakistani judge, allegedly assassinated by Zulfiqar Ali Bhutto

== See also ==
- Kasur (disambiguation)
