= Khandan =

Khandan or Khandaan may refer to:

- Khandan Rural District, rural district in Iran
- Khandaan (1942 film), an Indian film
- Khandan (1965 film), an Indian Hindi-language film
- Khandaan (1979 film), an Indian Hindi-language drama film by Anil Ganguly
- Khandaan (TV series), a 1985 Indian television soap opera

== See also ==
- Khan (disambiguation)
- Khanda (disambiguation)
- Khandaani Shafakhana, 2019 Indian Hindi-language comedy-drama film
