= Kandala =

Kandala may refer to:

- Kandala (pogost), a Sami pogost (populated place) in Kolsky Uyezd of the Tsardom of Russia
- Kandala Subrahmanyam (1920–2018), Indian lawyer, socialist leader, freedom activist, and parliamentarian
- Kevin Kandala (born 1992), Zimbabwean first-class cricketer; see 2013–14 Pro50 Championship

== See also ==
- Konidela (disambiguation)
- Kandra (disambiguation)
- Kandal (disambiguation)
- Kandalan (disambiguation)
- Kandali (disambiguation)
- Kandel (disambiguation)
- Kanda (disambiguation)
- Kandla, a port in Gujarat state, India
- Kandhla, town in Uttar Pradesh, India
  - Kandhlawi, toponymic surname from the town
- Khandala, hill station in Maharashtra, India
- Qandala, an ancient port city in Somalia
- Kandhal Jadeja, Indian politician
