= Kanda =

Kanda may refer to:

== People ==
- Kanda (surname)
- Kanda Bongo Man (born 1955), Congolese soukous musician

== Places ==
=== Japan ===
- Kanda, Tokyo, an area in Chiyoda-ku, Tokyo
  - Kanda Station (Tokyo), a railway station in the area
- Kanda River, a river in Tokyo
- Kanda, Fukuoka, a town in Fukuoka Prefecture, in which the southern half of Kitakyushu Airport is located
  - Kanda Station (Fukuoka), a train station in the town

=== Nepal ===
- Kanda, Bajhang, a village
- Kanda, Bajura, a village
- Kanda, Rapti, a village

=== Elsewhere ===
- Kanda, a town in Ngounié Province, Gabon
- Kanda Estates, a residential development in Accra, Ghana
- Kanda, Mohács, Hungary
- Kanda, Uttarakhand, a town in Uttarakhand, India

== Other uses ==
- Kanda (lineage), a lineage and often ruling house or dynasty among the BaKongo specifically during the Kingdom of Kongo
- Kanda or Angoram language, of Papua New Guinea
- Kanda Shrine, a landmark in Tokyo
- Kanda Matsuri, a Japanese festival that takes place in Kanda, Tokyo
- Kanda University of International Studies, a university in Chiba, Japan
- Kanda or kenda, common names for the plant Macaranga peltata
- Kāṇḍa, a Sanskrit word meaning "chapter", used in the names of the chapters of some Hindu books, e.g. the Ramayana, Shatapatha Brahmana etc.
- Kanda Software, an American IT company

== See also ==
- Kand (disambiguation)
- Khand (disambiguation)
- Khanda (disambiguation)
- Kenda (disambiguation)
- Kandal (disambiguation)
- Kandala (disambiguation)
- Kandalan (disambiguation)
- Konidela (disambiguation)
- Kandali (disambiguation)
- Kandel (disambiguation)
- Khond language (disambiguation)
- Khond people, of southeastern India
