= Fasham =

City in Tehran province, Iran

Fasham Persian: فشم
- City
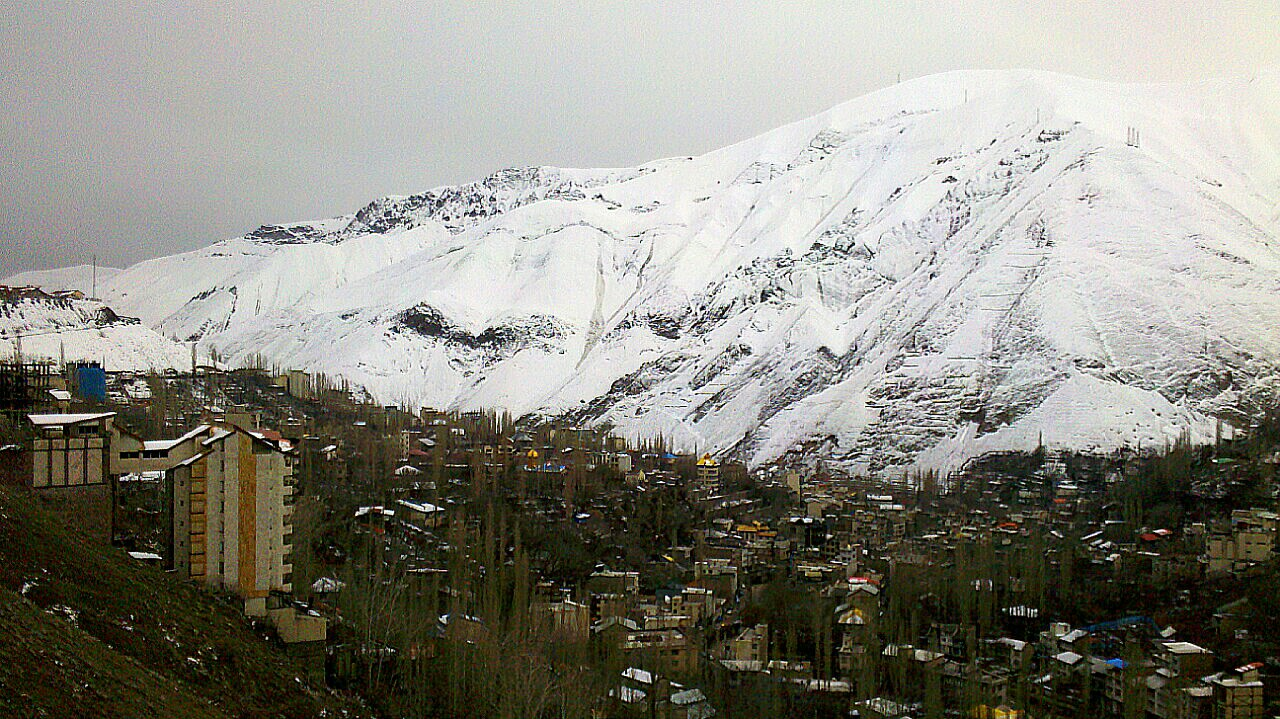

- Location within Iran
- Coordinates: 35°55′46″N 51°31′35″E
- Country: Iran
- Province: Tehran
- County: Shemiranat
- District: Rudbar-e Qasran

Population (2016)
  - Total: 6,945
- Time zone: UTC+3:30 (IRST)

Fasham (Persian: فشم) (Note: Also known as Facham, Fashand, and Pasham) is a city in, and the capital of, Rudbar-e Qasran District in Shemiranat County, Tehran province, Iran.

== Demographics ==
=== Population ===
At the time of the 2006 National Census, the city's population was 6,895 in 2,019 households. The following census in 2011 counted 7,994 people in 2,509 households. The 2016 census measured the population of the city as 2,294 households.

== See also ==
Media related to Fasham at Wikimedia Commons
