= Shemshak =

City in Tehran province, Iran

Shemshak Persian: شمشک
- City
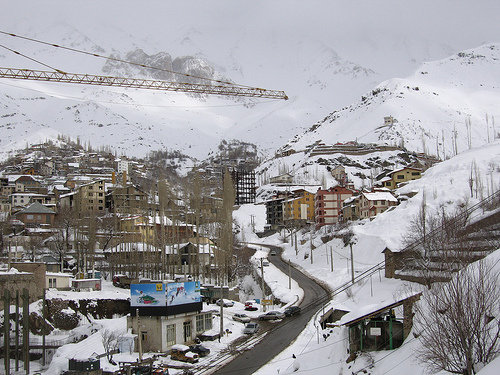
- Landscape in the city of Shemshak

- Location within Iran
- Coordinates: 36°00′56″N 51°29′10″E
- Country: Iran
- Province: Tehran
- County: Shemiranat
- District: Rudbar-e Qasran
- Established as a city: 2012

Population (2016)
  - Total: 3,423
- Time zone: UTC+3:30 (IRST)

Shemshak (Persian: شمشک) is a city in Rudbar-e Qasran District of Shemiranat County, Tehran province, Iran. A suburb of Tehran, Shemshak was established upon the merger of the former villages of Darband Sar, Darrud, Jirud, Sefidestan, Shemshak-e Bala, and Shemshak-e Pain in 2012.

== Demographics ==
=== Population ===
At the time of the 2016 National Census, the population was 3,423 people in 1,197 households.

== See also ==
Media related to Shemshak at Wikimedia Commons

Shemshak travel guide from Wikivoyage
