= Ammameh =

Village in Tehran province, Iran

Ammameh Persian: امامه
- Village
- Location within Iran
- Coordinates: 35°54′23″N 51°35′04″E
- Country: Iran
- Province: Tehran
- County: Shemiranat
- District: Rudbar-e Qasran
- Rural District: Rudbar-e Qasran
- Highest elevation: 2,400 m (7,900 ft)
- Lowest elevation: 2,250 m (7,380 ft)

Population (2016)
  - Total: 1,336
- Time zone: UTC+3:30 (IRST)

Ammameh (Persian: امامه), is a village combining the villages of Ammameh-ye Bala and Ammameh-ye Pain in Rudbar-e Qasran Rural District of Rudbar-e Qasran District in Shemiranat County, Tehran province, Iran.

== Demographics ==
=== Population ===
At the time of the 2006 National Census, the village's population (as the total of its constituent villages) was 747 in 210 households. The following census in 2011 counted 1,262 people in 408 households. The 2016 census measured the population of the village as 1,336 people in 439 households. It was the most populous village in its rural district.

== Villages ==
Ammameh-ye Bala (امامه بالا) (Note: Also romanized as Ammāmeh-e Bālā; also known as Ammāmeh-ye Deh-e Bālā) at the time of 2006 census, had a population of 675 in 188 households. The following census in 2011 counted 1,066 people in 349 households. The 2016 census population was 1,315 people in 429 households.

Ammameh-ye Pain (امامه پايين) (Note: Also romanized as Ammāmeh-e Pā’īn and Amāmeh-ye Pā’īn; also known as Ammāmeh-ye Deh-e Pā’īn and Umam-i-Paīn) at the time of 2006 census, had a population of 72 in 22 households. The following census in 2011 counted 196 people in 59 households. The 2016 census population was 21 people in 10 households.
