= Khond language =

Khond language may refer to:

- Kui language (India), a Dravidian language of eastern India (Odisha and Andhra Pradesh) spoken by the Khonds
- Kuvi language, another Dravidian language of India

== See also ==
- Kui language (disambiguation)
- Kanda (disambiguation)
