= Kandra (disambiguation) =

Kandra is a census town in Saraikela Kharsawan district, Jharkhand, India considered a part of Jamshedpur city.

Kandra may also refer to:

- Kandra, Bardhaman, a village in Ketugram I CD Block in Katwa subdivision, Bardhaman district, West Bengal, India
- Luke Kandra (born 2001), American football player

== See also ==
- Kandala (disambiguation)
- Kandar (disambiguation)
- Kandara (disambiguation)
