= Kui =

Kui may refer to:

== People ==
- Kui people, a Mon-Khmer ethnic minority
- Kui Lee, a singer-songwriter

=== People with the surname Kui (奎) ===
- Ryoko Kui, a Japanese manga artist, creator of Delicious in Dungeon
- Kui Yuanyuan, a Chinese gymnast

== Places ==
- Kui, Hiroshima, a Japanese town
- Kawau Island Airport, IATA code KUI, on Kawau Island

== Astronomy ==
- Kui, or Legs, a Chinese constellation (in pinyin: Kuí Xiù)
- Eta Andromedae, a star also named Kui - from the name of the Chinese constellation Kuí Xiù - in the IAU Catalog of Star Names
- KUI is used to designate double stars discovered by Dutch-American astronomer Gerard Kuiper, including:
  - KUI 91AB, a variable star of Delta Cephei type
  - KUI 93AB, an eclipsing binary of Algol variable type

== Other uses ==
- Kui (Chinese mythology) 夔, a one-legged mountain demon, also legendary inventor of music and dance
- Kui (dragonball), a manga character
- Kui (music), musical concept from Kazakh
- Kui (Māori mythology), a chthonic Māori demigod, also father of Vahi-vero in Tuamotu mythology
- Kui kuningas nutab, a 1997 song by Terminaator
- Kui language (India), a Dravidian language spoken by the Khonds, mostly in Odisha
- Kui language (Indonesia), a Timor–Alor–Pantar language
- Kui the Horseclaw, a character in Nausicaä of the Valley of the Wind
- KUI, acronym for Kinetic user interface
