= QS Aquilae =

Star in the constellation Aquila

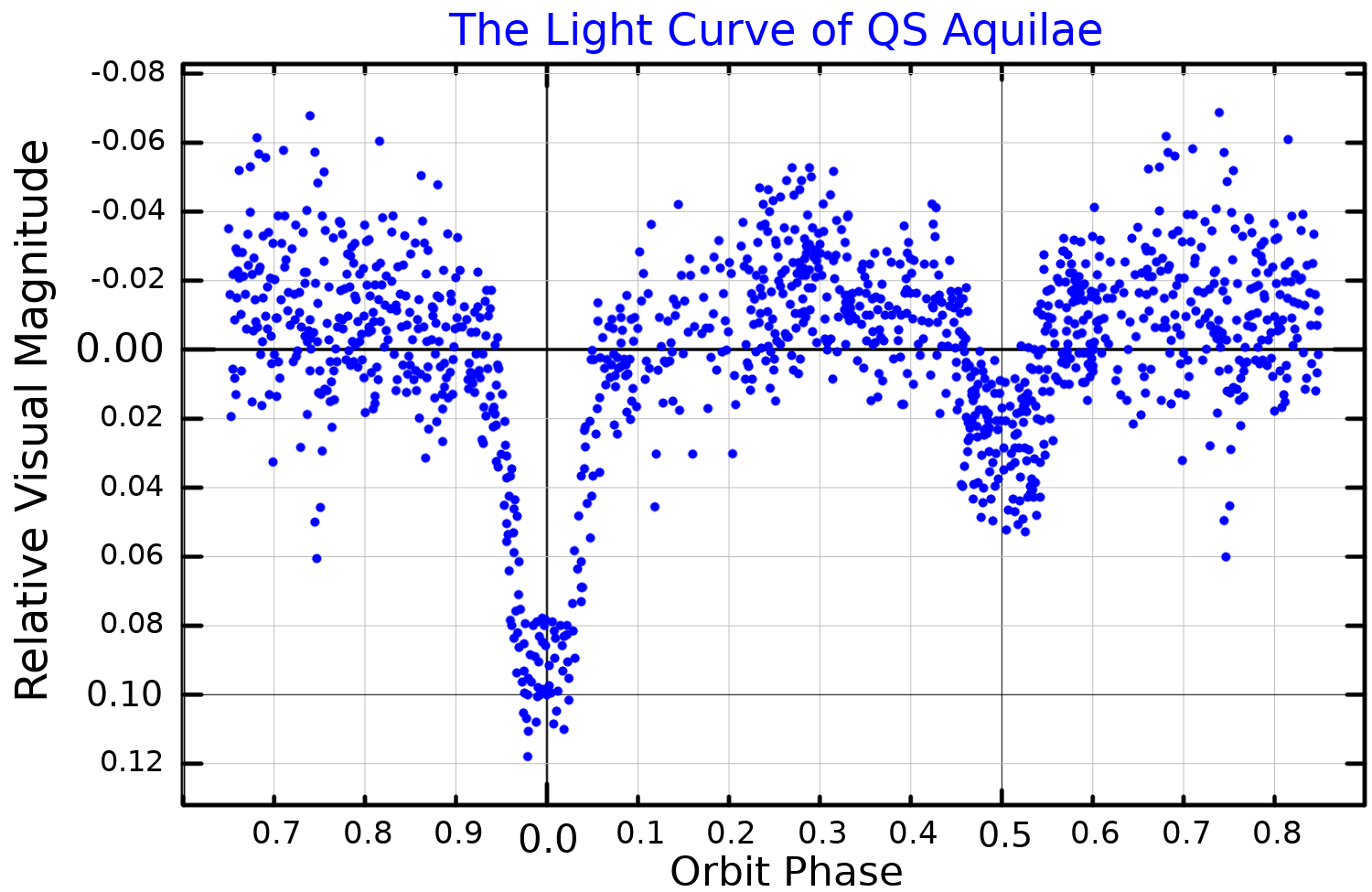
- A visual band light curve for QS Aquilae. Adapted from Zasche et al. (2017)

Observation data Epoch J2000 Equinox ICRS
- Constellation: Aquila
- Right ascension: 19^{h} 41^{m} 05.528^{s}
- Declination: +13° 48′ 56.45″
- Apparent magnitude (V): 5.988

Characteristics
- Spectral type: B5V
- U−B color index: −0.52
- B−V color index: −0.08
- Variable type: Eclipsing binary

Astrometry
Radial velocity (R_{v})	−14.2 ± 2 km/s
Proper motion (μ)	RA: −0.04 ± 0.60 mas/yr Dec.: −11.47 ± 0.43 mas/yr
Parallax (π)	0.49±0.62 mas

Orbit
Primary	QS Aquilae AB (eclipsing pair)
Name	QS Aquilae C
Period (P)	77.0±4.3 yr
Semi-major axis (a)	0.111±0.045″
Eccentricity (e)	0.947±0.038
Inclination (i)	61.2±3.6°
Longitude of the node (Ω)	144.5±5.1°
Periastron epoch (T)	1962.3±2.3
Argument of periastron (ω) (secondary)	336.8±4.7°

Orbit
Primary	QS Aquilae A
Name	QS Aquilae B
Period (P)	2.5132987±0.0000075 d
Semi-major axis (a)	13.78±0.11 R⊙
Inclination (i)	83.6±1.3°
Semi-amplitude (K_{1}) (primary)	73.98±0.33 km/s
Semi-amplitude (K_{2}) (secondary)	201.76±2.09 km/s

Other designations
- KUI 93, QS Aql, BD+13°4098, HD 185936, HIP 96840, HR 7486, WDS J19411+1349, 2MASS J19410553+1348565

Database references
SIMBAD	data

QS Aquilae is a triple or quadruple star system consisting of an eclipsing binary in a 2.5 day orbit around which a third star orbits in 77 years. There is some indication that there is a fourth component with a period of roughly 18 years. Located in the constellation Aquila, its visual magnitude varies from 5.93 to 6.06, making it barely visible to the naked eye.

The star's variability was discovered photometrically by Paul Guthnick and Richard Prager in 1930. It was given its variable star designation in 1934.
