= Khand (Bansagar) =

- Town
- Location in Madhya Pradesh, India Khand (India)
- Coordinates: 24°10′45″N 81°17′46″E
- Country: India
- State: Madhya Pradesh
- District: Shahdol

Government
  - Type: MP government

Population (2011)
  - Total: 10,653

Languages
  - Official: Hindi
- Time zone: UTC+5:30 (IST)
- Postal code: 484776
- ISO 3166 code: IN-MP
- Vehicle registration: MP

A town and a nagar panchayat in Shahdol district in the Indian state of Madhya Pradesh. The city is divided into 15 wards in which elections are held every 5 years.

== Demographics ==
As of the 2011 India census, Khand (Bansagar) had a population of 10,653. Males constitute roughly 53.25% of the population and females 46.75%. Khand (Bansagar) has an average literacy rate of 75.1%, higher than the district average of 66.7%: male literacy is 85.02 %, and female literacy is 63.96 %. In Khand (Bansagar), 12% of the population is under 6 years of age. The largest religious group in the city is Hindu distantly followed by Muslim and Buddhist.
