= Bagh-e Gol, Kerman =

Bagh-e Gol باغ گل
- Village
- Location within Iran
- Coordinates: 29°10′12″N 57°49′12″E
- Country: Iran
- Province: Kerman
- County: Bam
- Bakhsh: Central
- Rural District: Howmeh

Population (2006)
  - Total: 69
- Time zone: UTC+3:30 (IRST)
  - Summer (DST): UTC+4:30 (IRDT)

Bagh-e Gol (Persian: باغ گل, also Romanized as Bāgh-e Gol) is a village in Howmeh Rural District, in the Central District of Bam County, Kerman Province, Iran. At the 2006 census, its population was 69, in 23 families.
