= Lavasan-e Kuchak Rural District =

Rural district in Tehran province, Iran

Lavasan-e Kuchak Rural District Persian: دهستان لواسان کوچک
- Rural District
- Location within Iran
- Coordinates: 35°54′N 51°40′E
- Country: Iran
- Province: Tehran
- County: Shemiranat
- District: Lavasanat
- Established: 1987
- Capital: Afjeh

Population (2016)
  - Total: 5,680
- Time zone: UTC+3:30 (IRST)

Lavasan-e Kuchak Rural District (Persian: دهستان لواسان کوچک) is in Lavasanat District of Shemiranat County, Tehran province, Iran. Its capital is the village of Afjeh.

== Demographics ==
=== Population ===
At the time of the 2006 National Census, the rural district's population was 2,968 in 859 households. There were 5,918 inhabitants in 1,946 households at the following census of 2011. The 2016 census measured the population of the rural district as 5,680 in 1,963 households. The most populous of its 27 villages was Afjeh, with 1,257 people.

=== Other villages in the rural district ===
- Barg-e Jahan
- Hanzak
- Kond-e Olya
- Rahatabad
