= Khand, Vikramgad =

Village in Maharashtra

Khand
- village
- Location in Maharashtra, India Khand (India)
- Coordinates: 19.7819028°N 73.1069298°E
- Country: India
- State: Maharashtra
- District: Palghar
- Taluka: Vikramgad
- Elevation: 75 m (246 ft)

Population (2011)
  - Total: 1,930
- Time zone: UTC+5:30 (IST)
- 2011 census code: 551802

Khand is a village in the Palghar district of Maharashtra, India. It is located in the Vikramgad taluka.

== Demographics ==
According to the 2011 census of India, Khand has 351 households. The effective literacy rate (i.e. the literacy rate of population excluding children aged 6 and below) is 57.88%.

Demographics (2011 Census)
	Total	Male	Female
Population	1930	954	976
Children aged below 6 years	351	188	163
Scheduled caste	0	0	0
Scheduled tribe	1890	935	955
Literates	914	504	410
Workers (all)	1155	537	618
Main workers (total)	789	431	358
Main workers: Cultivators	561	334	227
Main workers: Agricultural labourers	192	75	117
Main workers: Household industry workers	2	2	0
Main workers: Other	34	20	14
Marginal workers (total)	366	106	260
Marginal workers: Cultivators	144	29	115
Marginal workers: Agricultural labourers	107	24	83
Marginal workers: Household industry workers	1	1	0
Marginal workers: Others	114	52	62
Non-workers	775	417	358
