= Khanda, Jind =

Khanda
- Village
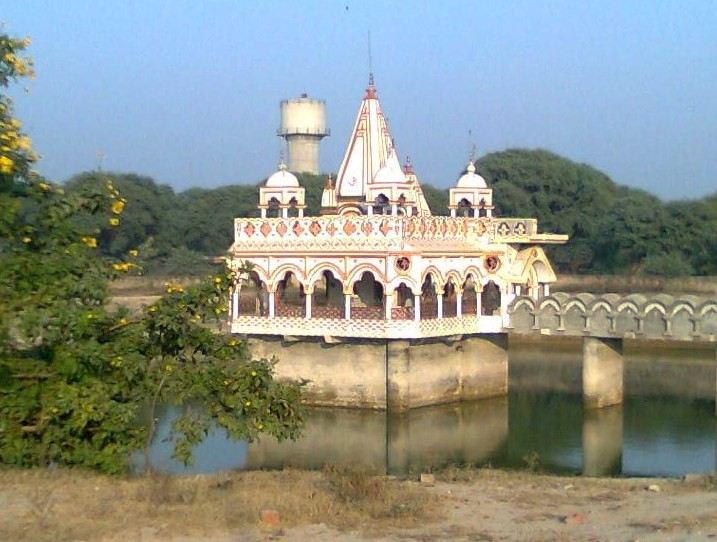
- Parshuram Temple located at Khanda

- Location within Haryana Location within India
- Coordinates: 29°27′24″N 76°27′42″E
- Country: India
- State: Haryana
- District: Jind
- Mandal: Alewa
- Named for: Khandel
- Seat: Gram panchayat
- Elevation: 227 m (745 ft)

Population (2011)
  - Total: 3,500

Languages
  - Official: English, Hindi
  - Regional: Haryanvi
- Time zone: UTC+5:30 (IST)
- PIN: 126102
- Village code: 00313300
- Climate: Cw (Köppen)
- Ethnic groups: Brahmin

Khanda is a village located in Jind district of Haryana, India. It comes under Alewa Mandal. It lies 20.2 kilometres to the east of Jind and 132 kilometres to the north-west of New Delhi.

== History ==
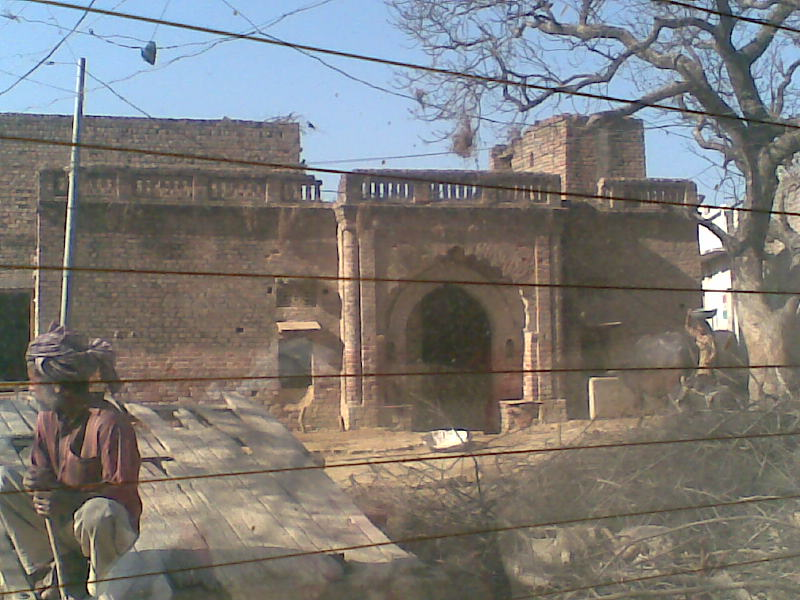
An old house in Khanda.

It is believed that this village was earlier a town named Khandel but was deserted after some time. When it was inhabited again, it was again named as Khanda. An old temple of Hindu god Parshuram is located at the corner of the village. A new temple has been built on a large platform located inside the pond near the old temple.

== Demographics ==
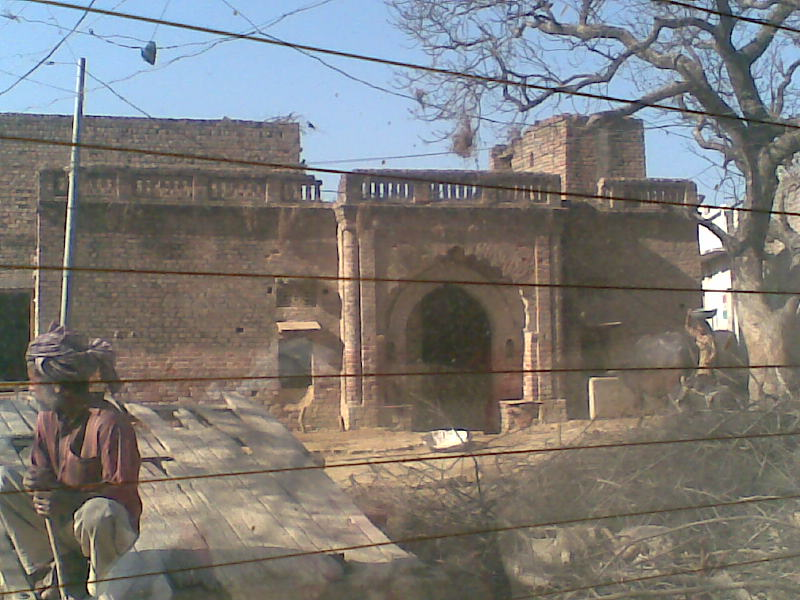

According to 2011 census of India, Khanda has a total population of 3500. During 2011 census, village code was provided to each village of India. Village code of Khanda is 00313300. Brahmins are the predominant group.

== Education ==
A total of three schools are located in the village. One of them is a public high school and the other two are private schools named after Parshuram. One of them is of middle level and the other is of senior secondary level.
