= Kandalan, Kurdistan =

Kandalan كندلان
- Village
- Location within Iran
- Coordinates: 36°15′24″N 46°03′59″E
- Country: Iran
- Province: Kurdistan
- County: Saqqez
- Bakhsh: Central
- Rural District: Tamugheh

Population (2006)
  - Total: 517
- Time zone: UTC+3:30 (IRST)
  - Summer (DST): UTC+4:30 (IRDT)

Kandalan (Persian: كندلان, also Romanized as Kandalān) is a village in Tamugheh Rural District, in the Central District of Saqqez County, Kurdistan Province, Iran. At the 2006 census, its population was 517, in 96 families. The village is populated by Kurds.
