= Jayammu Nischayammu Raa (2016 film) =

- Official poster
- Directed by: Shiva Raj Kanumuri
- Screenplay by: Shiva Raj Kanumuri; Param Suryanshu
- Story by: Shiva Raj Kanumuri
- Produced by: Shiva Raj Kanumuri; Satish Kanumuri
- Starring: Srinivasa Reddy; Poorna; Ravi Varma; Praveen; Sree Vishnu
- Cinematography: Nagesh Banell
- Edited by: Venkat
- Music by: Ravichandra; Karthik Rodriguez
- Production company: Shiva Raj Kanumuri
- Release date: 25 November 2016
- Running time: 162 minutes
- Country: India
- Language: Telugu

Jayammu Nischayammu Raa(transl. 'Victory is certain')is a 2016 Indian Telugu comedy drama film directed and produced by Shiva Raj Kanumuri under his banner Shiva Raj Films. It stars Srinivasa Reddy, Shamna Kasim, Ravi Varma, and Praveen. The film was inspired by the 1976 Hindi movie Chhoti Si Baat, which is loosely based on the 1960 British movie School for Scoundrels.

== Plot ==
In 2013, in Andhra Pradesh, Mangallam Sarvesh Kumar, also known as Sarvamangalam "Sarvam" (played by Srinivas Reddy), is a man from Karimnagar who has been preparing for the state PSC exams for the past 10 years. Sarvam is shy, naive, and a firm believer in astrology, following the guidance of Pitha (Jeeva), a well-known astrologer. He finally receives a call for an interview in Hyderabad. On his way to attend the interview, he spots a woman in the market and immediately falls in love.

He calls Pitha, who tells him that the woman he saw in the marketplace is a lucky charm and might be the reason he got the job. Sarvam is posted to the Kakinada Municipal Office, where he stays as a caretaker at a friend's house. He hopes to transfer to his hometown to care for his elderly, widowed mother. The transfer request is with the commissioner, JC (Ravi Varma), a womanizer. JC promises to approve Sarvam's transfer in exchange for using Sarvam's house for his romantic affairs.

Sarvam discovers that the woman he saw is Rani (Poorna), a temporary worker at an eSeva office next to his. He obtains her birth certificate to match his horoscope with hers. After finding a perfect match, he decides to win her over to improve his fortunes. Rani is a working-class woman who doesn’t believe in astrology. She dislikes her job and dreams of owning a nursery. She applies for government land for her nursery through the municipal office, and Sarvam is assigned to handle her file. This leads him to befriend her.

After some time, Sarvam decides to propose to Rani at her favorite restaurant. However, she doesn’t show up, as she has fallen in love with JC, who has also proposed to her, and she accepts. After a surprise birthday party for Rani, Sarvam discovers her actual date of birth and sends the corrected information to Pitha, who advises him to stay away from her because their horoscopes don’t match and she would bring bad luck to him. Frightened, Sarvam tries to distance himself from her.

JC summons Sarvam to his office and instructs him to lend his house for the night. JC then brings Rani to Sarvam’s house under the pretense of giving her a birthday gift. Shocked by JC’s unwanted advances, Rani tries to escape. Meanwhile, Sarvam, struggling with his conscience, decides to help her by unlocking the door, allowing Rani to escape. This experience leads Sarvam to realize that he possesses good intentions and the courage to do the right thing, but he lacks self-confidence and self-belief. With newfound confidence, he stops relying on astrology and decides to face the world with a fresh perspective.

Meanwhile, JC places a hold on Sarvam's transfer orders to Karimnagar for his own selfish reasons. Later, frustrated with Rani, he also delays approval of her files. However, Sarvam successfully gets them approved through the collector’s office, and Rani is allotted a plot for her nursery. She begins preparing for her nursery work, while her brother arranges a match for her that meets her criteria. However, she realizes she loves Sarvam and decides to propose to him at her nursery's opening.

Meanwhile, after several failed attempts to win Rani’s affection and noticing that Sarvam is getting closer to her, JC offers Sarvam a transfer on the condition that he leaves Rani. Sarvam rejects this offer, instead challenging JC, vowing to get his transfer approved directly and warning him to stay away from Rani. Later that night, JC sets up his private activities at the house of Adapa, a senior officer supervising Sarvam. Sarvam and his friends create a disturbance in the area, aiming to expose JC’s actions. Afraid his secrets will be revealed, JC finally approves Sarvam’s transfer order.

Later, seeking revenge, JC offers a large sum to Tatkal, a local broker known for shady deals in the government office, to drive a wedge between Rani and Sarvam. Although Tatkal has a good relationship with Sarvam, he double-crosses him by revealing a partial truth to Rani about Sarvam’s belief in horoscopes and allowing JC to use his house for his own affairs. Feeling betrayed, Rani begins to avoid Sarvam and agrees to marry the groom her family has chosen for her.

At the wedding, Rani learns the full truth about Sarvam from his neighbor. Regretting her misunderstanding, she now wants to marry him. Sarvam and Rani reconcile, and Sarvam strikes another deal with Tatkal to stop Rani’s marriage. However, his efforts are thwarted by the head priest, who holds a grudge against him for previously opposing his request for permission to reconstruct his house.

Realizing this, Sarvam approaches the priest for help. The priest recalls Sarvam’s past kindness—Sarvam had once assisted him in securing permission from the collector’s office for his house reconstruction along with approving Rani’s files. Moved by Sarvam’s gesture, the priest promised to help him whenever needed. With the priest's assistance, they cause the groom to fall unconscious, resulting in the wedding being called off.

On his final day at the Kakinada office, Sarvam deceives Tatkal to keep him quiet about their deal to stop Rani's wedding, then exposes Tatkal’s shady dealings with JC. Later, Sarvam reveals JC's misconduct to the media, including the events of the night JC signed his transfer order. In fact, this was a trap set by Sarvam to expose JC while securing his transfer. Sarvam’s actions make him a hero within his department.

Later, Rani and Sarvam get married. Ultimately, Sarvam is transferred to Karimnagar, and they plan to relocate Rani's nursery as well.

== Cast ==
- Srinivasa Reddy as Mangalam Survesh Kumar, aka Sarvamangalam "Sarvam"
- Poorna as Rani
- Ravi Varma as JC, Sarvam's boss
- Praveen as Tatkal
- Sree Vishnu as Kantha Rao, a young and charming government employee who works in the Roads and Buildings department, who is the rival for Sarvam to woo Rani.
- Krishnudu as Rani's brother
- Posani Krishna Murali as Guntur Panthulu
- Krishna Bhagavaan as Adapa Prasad
- Dubbing Janaki as Sarvam's mother, Andalamma
- Krishnam Raju (Jogi Raju)
- Jogi Naidu
- Jeeva as Pitha Baba
- Rahul Ramakrishna as Yadagiri
- Meena
- Thagubothu Ramesh as RMP Sachin
- Raghu Karumanchi as Bolt, a cunning Telangana settler in Kakinada; assistant to Seenanna
- Prabhas Sreenu as Seenanna, a cunning mechanic
- Rajendra Pinnamaraju
- Sunny
- Siri
- Mirchi Hemanth as Ranjit, Rani's bridegroom and follower of Pitha Baba

== Production ==
The movie had various shooting schedules in Hyderabad, Vizag, Yanam, and Kakinada. The first look of the film was launched on 15 February 2016 by director Trivikram and actor Nithiin.

== Soundtrack ==
Jayammu Nischayammu Raa

Soundtrack album by Ravi Chandra
- Released: 2016
- Recorded: 2016
- Genre: Feature film soundtrack
- Length: 19:42
- Label: Aditya Music
- Producer: Ravi Chandra
External audio
- Official Audio Jukebox on YouTube

The music was composed by Ravi Chandra and released by Aditya Music.

Track list
No.	Title	Lyrics	Singer(s)	Length
1.	"Hello Everybody"	V.V. Raamanjhaneyulu	Bhargavi Pillai, Ravi Chandra, Karthik Rodridguez	4:21
2.	"Thaka Dimtaka"	Srini Indhukuri	Haricharan	3:52
3.	"O Rangula Chiluka"	V.V. Raamanjhaneyulu	Spandana	2:23
4.	"Nee Navvullo"	Chandu	Ravi Chandra	4:19
5.	"Kalalu Naavena"	R. Raamu	Haricharan	4:47
Total length:				19:42

== Reception ==
A critic from The Times of India wrote, "Jayammu Nischayammu Raa makes you root for the underdog, empathise for Sarvam and makes you want to believe that ‘good conquers evil’. If you have been looking for a good weekend watch with the family, this is it."

A critic from The Hindu commented, "Debutant director Shiva Raj brings out a fine blend of social message and situational humour; this one is sure to grow on you, albeit slowly. A simple story with familiar faces, it slowly but surely keeps you engaged."

Jeevi of Idlebrain.com noted, "The movie starts off on a promising note by establishing the plot point. But loses steam through half way."
