= Kenda (disambiguation) =

Kenda is a census town in Paschim Bardhaman in the Indian state of West Bengal.

Kenda may also refer to:

- New Kenda, operational area of Eastern Coalfields Limited, in Paschim Bardhaman district, West Bengal, India
- Kenda, Purulia, a village, with a police station, in Purulia district, West Bengal, India
- Kenda Area, operational area of Eastern Coalfields Limited, in Paschim Bardhaman district, West Bengal, India
- Macaranga peltata, a plant found in northern Thailand, Sri Lanka and India
- Joe Kenda (born 1946), American police detective
- Kenda Perez (born 1983), Mexican-American model and host
- Kenda Rubber Industrial Company, a tire manufacturer in Taiwan
- Kenya National Democratic Alliance, a political party in Kenya

== See also ==
- Kanda (disambiguation)
