= Kandal, Hormozgan =

Kandal كندال
- Village
- Location within Iran
- Coordinates: 26°52′17″N 57°02′42″E
- Country: Iran
- Province: Hormozgan
- County: Minab
- Bakhsh: Byaban
- Rural District: Bemani

Population (2006)
  - Total: 825
- Time zone: UTC+3:30 (IRST)
  - Summer (DST): UTC+4:30 (IRDT)

Kandal (Persian: كندال, also Romanized as Kandāl) is a village in Bemani Rural District, Byaban District, Minab County, Hormozgan Province, Iran. At the 2006 census, its population was 825, in 125 families.
