= Ab Nik, Lali =

Ab Nik اب نيك
- Village
- Country: Iran
- Province: Khuzestan
- County: Lali
- Bakhsh: Hati
- Rural District: Hati

Population (2006)
  - Total: 96
- Time zone: UTC+3:30 (IRST)
  - Summer (DST): UTC+4:30 (IRDT)

Ab Nik (Persian: اب نيك, also Romanized as Āb Nīḵ) is a village in Hati Rural District, Hati District, Lali County, Khuzestan province, Iran. At the 2006 census, its population was 96, in 16 families.
