= Kandilli Earthquake Museum =

Museum in Turkey

- Kandilli Rasathanesi ve Deprem Araştırma Enstitüsü Müzesi
- Location of Kandilli Earthquake Museum in Istanbul, Turkey
- Established: June 21, 2006; 20 years ago
- Location: Kandilli, Üsküdar, Istanbul, Turkey
- Coordinates: 41.06383°N 29.05991°E
- Type: Science and technology
- Owner: Boğaziçi University

Kandilli Earthquake Museum, or more formally Museum of Kandilli Observatory and Earthquake Research Institut (Turkish: Kandilli Rasathanesi ve Deprem Araştırma Enstitüsü Müzesi), is a museum devoted mainly to seismology and earthquake science in Turkey. It is situated within the campus of Kandilli Observatory in Kandilli neighborhood of Üsküdar district in Istanbul.

Owned by the Boğaziçi University, the museum was opened on June 21, 2006, and is housed in a renovated building, which was constructed in 1934 as a laboratory for seismography. In the museum, various scientific instruments are on exhibition that were used in astronomical and geoscientific works. Among the objects exhibited in the museum are 32 of the 581 skin of Kandilli manuscripts, including 1,369 books in Turkish, Arabic and Persian on astronomy, astrology, mathematics and geography.

The museum was established with the instruction of Recep Tayyip Erdoğan, the prime minister of the period. The historical building was restored by the Istanbul Metropolitan Municipality and the interior was designed by Boğaziçi University. The museum was inaugurated on 21 June 2006.
