= Qandil, Iran =

Qandil قنديل
- Village
- Location within Iran
- Coordinates: 29°53′06″N 51°34′31″E
- Country: Iran
- Province: Fars
- County: Kazerun
- Bakhsh: Chenar Shahijan
- Rural District: Somghan

Population (2006)
  - Total: 394
- Time zone: UTC+3:30 (IRST)
  - Summer (DST): UTC+4:30 (IRDT)

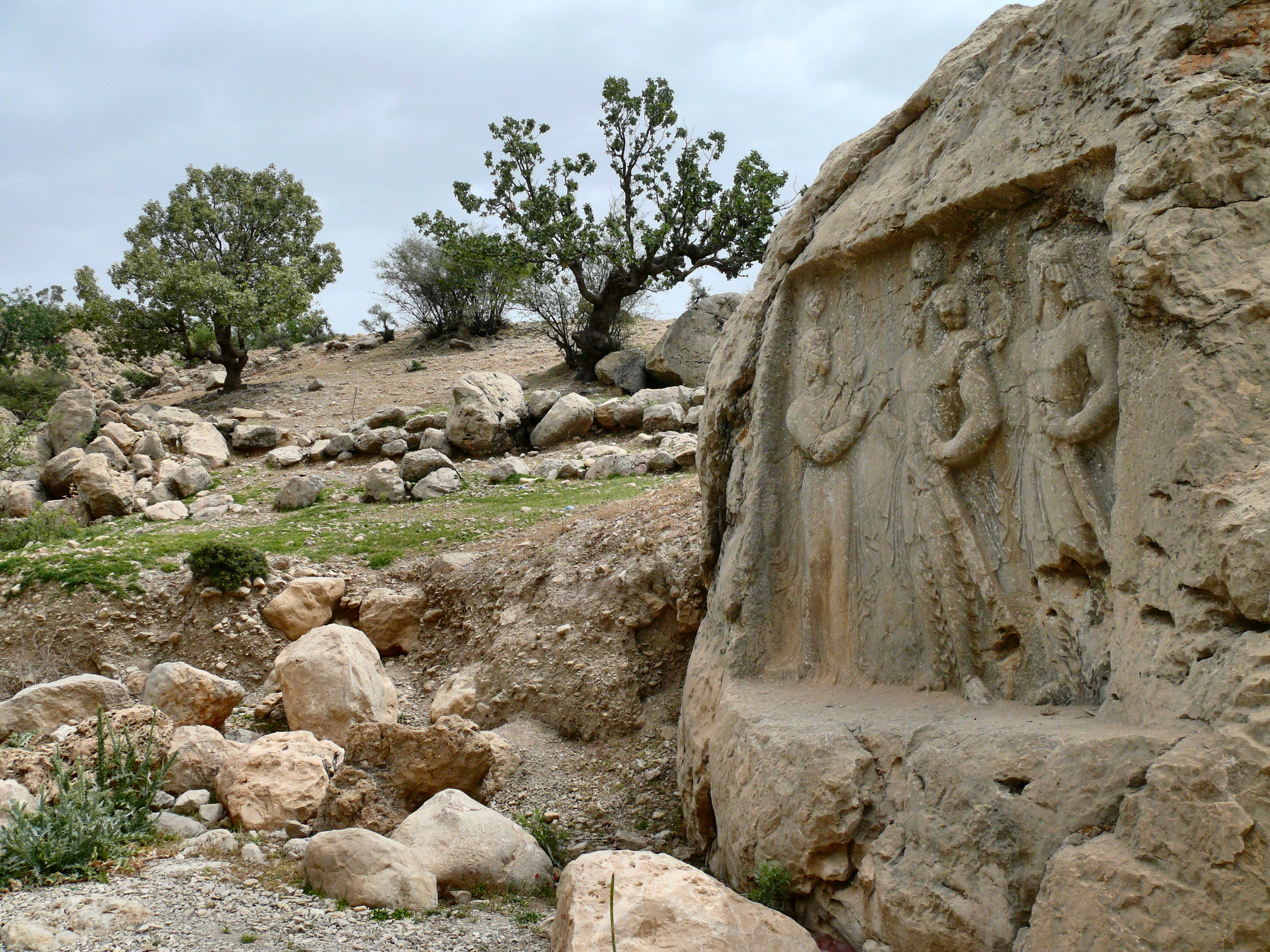
Sasanian rock relief at Sarab-e Qandil, attributed to King Bahram II. The scene shows the Queen offering King Bahram II a lotus flower. Behing the royal couple, stands Bahram's son, future King Bahram II holding the ring of power.

Qandil (Persian: قنديل, also Romanized as Qandīl) is a village in Somghan Rural District, Chenar Shahijan District, Kazerun County, Fars province, Iran. At the 2006 census, its population was 394, in 99 families.
