= Kandali =

Kandali may refer to:

- Madhava Kandali, a 14th-century Indian poet of Assamese
- Kandali Festival, a festival held by the Bhotiya tribe of Pithoragarh district, Uttarakhand, India
- Strobilanthes wallichii, a plant from the Himalayas that flowers every 12 years
- Lagenaria vulgaris, a species of gourd-bearing vine
- Urtica dioica, a plant better known as Stinging Nettle

== See also ==
- Qandil (disambiguation)
- Kandal (disambiguation)
- Kandala (disambiguation)
- Kandalan (disambiguation)
- Kandali (disambiguation)
- Kandel (disambiguation)
- Kanda (disambiguation)
