= Kusur, Vaibhavwadi =

Village in Maharashtra

Kusur
- Village
- Interactive map of Kusur
- Country: India
- State: Maharashtra

Kusur is a village in Vaibhavwadi tehsil, Sindhudurg district, Maharashtra, India.
