= Ab Nik, Izeh =

Ab Nik اب نيك
- Village
- Location within Iran
- Coordinates: 31°55′29″N 49°57′35″E
- Country: Iran
- Province: Khuzestan
- County: Izeh
- Bakhsh: Susan
- Rural District: Susan-e Gharbi

Population (2006)
  - Total: 53
- Time zone: UTC+3:30 (IRST)
  - Summer (DST): UTC+4:30 (IRDT)

Ab Nik (Persian: اب نيك, also Romanized as Āb Nīk) is a village in Susan-e Gharbi Rural District, Susan District, Izeh County, Khuzestan province, Iran. At the 2006 census, its population was 53, in 10 families.
