= Yasmine Kandil =

Egyptian-Canadian professor

Yasmine Kandil is an Egyptian-Canadian professor of applied drama.

== Education ==
Yasmine Kandil was educated at the American University in Cairo, where she graduated with a bachelor's degree in theatre. Additionally, she received a Master of Fine Arts Degree in theatre directing at the university and PhD in Applied Theatre with a focus on theatre for development at the University of Victoria (Canada). Her PhD focus was on 'Effective Methods of Theatre for Development Practice; Understanding the Conditions That Provide Autonomy and Empowerment for Marginalized Communities'.

== Career ==
Yasmine Kandil began her career working in Cairo with Mohammed Sobhy, with one of the country's leading directors. While doing this work, she discovered that "the mainstream milieu of theatre directors, actors, and producers was quite corrupt, sexist, and male chauvinist" (Kandil, 2015). This provoked her to move away from mainstream theatre and to commit to the development of theatre that reflected her values and beliefs. She then worked with a group of theatre graduates and friends to create Yaaru, an independent devised theatre company which trained themselves in the art of improvisation and devising skills. While working as a part of Yaaru, Kandil traveled through Europe and the Middle East working as an independent lighting designer, and designed for shows which have been featured in international film festivals and competitions. During this time she worked as an actor and as a director in various productions. Kandil later worked with the garbage pickers in the slums of Cairo to create works of applied theatre that celebrated the lives of this marginalized community and through this work discovered "the power of theatre to build community, and to bring some respite to people's otherwise harsh lives" (Kandil 2015). This influenced her later work with immigrant and refugee youth in Victoria, British Columbia. Kandil has worked in Cairo and its outskirts, Alexandria, and Menya town in the South of Egypt. She has also traveled as a lighting designer to Paris, Uzès (France), Brussels, Rome, Genoa, The Hague, Beirut, Damascus, Amman, and Victoria and St. Catharines in Canada.

== Current work ==
Currently, Kandil is developing a guide book for facilitators and directors interested in doing work with lay people wanting to create work that reflects their own experiences. Kandil is also developing research and documentation of the rise of Applied Theatre in post-revolution Egypt. She is currently an Assistant Professor teaching Applied Theatre at the University of Victoria's Department of Theatre.

== Awards and recognition ==
Kandil has been awarded the P.E.O International Peace Scholarship Award (2008 and 2005), and the Robert S. & Muriel A. Raguin Graduate Scholarship (2004–2005). Kandil has also been awarded the Artist in Residence Award by City of Victoria (2011), the 1-year UVic Graduate Student Fellowship (2009–2010), 3-year UVic Fellowship (2006–2009).

== Collaborators and influences ==
Kandil has collaborated with the garbage pickers of Cairo, the immigrant and refugee youth of Victoria, Community & Institutional Development in Cairo (CID), the Victoria Immigrant and Refugee Center Society (VIRCS) in Victoria, and the Inter-Cultural Association (ICA) of Greater Victoria. Her work has been influenced by Harold Pinter, Frank Wedekind, Caryl Churchill, Bertolt Brecht, Peter Brook, Jerzy Grotowski, Paulo Freire, Michael Etherton, Dorothy Heathcote, Tim Prentki, and Juliana Saxton.
