= Deh-e Kandal =

Deh-e Kandal ده کندل
- Village
- Location within Iran
- Coordinates: 31°11′36″N 61°42′03″E
- Country: Iran
- Province: Sistan and Baluchestan
- County: Hirmand
- Bakhsh: Central
- Rural District: Margan

Population (2006)
  - Total: 165
- Time zone: UTC+3:30 (IRST)
  - Summer (DST): UTC+4:30 (IRDT)

Deh-e Kandal (Persian: ده کندل; also known as Kandal) is a village in Margan Rural District, in the Central District of Hirmand County, Sistan and Baluchestan Province, Iran. At the 2006 census, its population was 165, in 39 families.
