= Konidela (surname) =

Konidela is a Telugu surname. Notable people with the surname include:

- Konidela Chiranjeevi, India film actor and producer.
- Konidela Pawan Kalyan, an Indian actor, politician, and philanthropist.
- Konidela Ram Charan, an Indian actor, producer and entrepreneur.
- Konidela Nagendra Babu, an Indian actor, producer and politician.
- Varun Tej Konidela, an Indian actor.
- Niharika Konidela, an Indian actress
