= Bagh-e Gol Gol =

Bagh-e Gol Gol باغ گل گل
- Village
- Location within Iran
- Coordinates: 33°12′16″N 47°50′11″E
- Country: Iran
- Province: Lorestan
- County: Pol-e Dokhtar
- Bakhsh: Central
- Rural District: Malavi

Population (2006)
  - Total: 181
- Time zone: UTC+3:30 (IRST)
  - Summer (DST): UTC+4:30 (IRDT)

Bagh-e Gol Gol (Persian: باغ گل گل, also Romanized as Bāgh-e Gol Gol and Bāgh-i-Gulgul; also known as Gol Gol) is a village in Malavi Rural District, in the Central District of Pol-e Dokhtar County, Lorestan Province, Iran. At the 2006 census, its population was 181, in 42 families.
