= Kandilli Observatory =

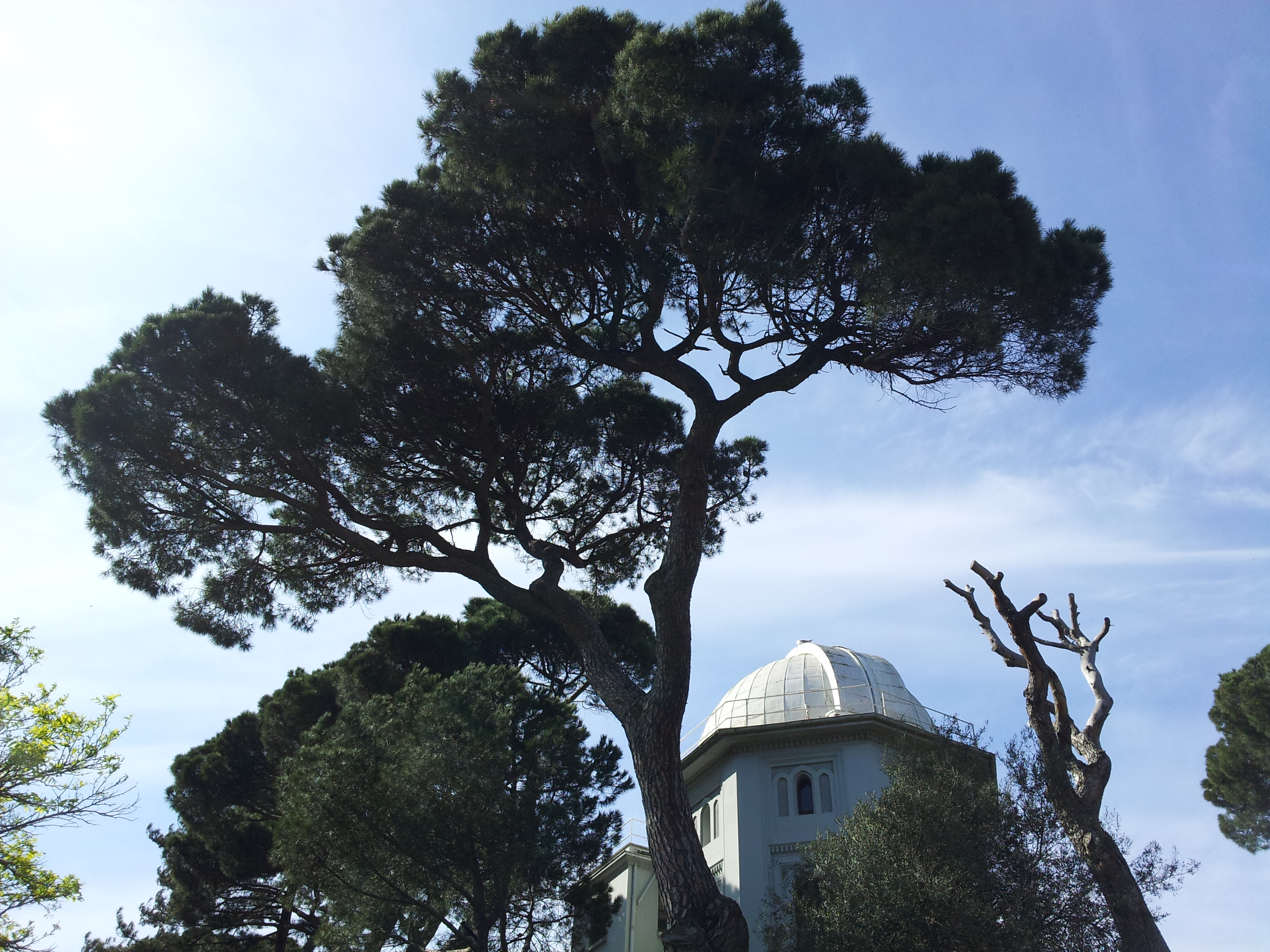
- Alternative names: KOERI
- Organization: Boğaziçi University
- Location: Kandilli, Üsküdar, Istanbul, Turkey
- Coordinates: 41°03′48″N 29°03′44″E
- Established: 1868; 158 years ago
- Website: www.koeri.boun.edu.tr/new/en
- Related media on Commons

Kandilli Observatory, or more formally Kandilli Observatory and Earthquake Research Institute (KOERI; Turkish: Kandilli Rasathanesi ve Deprem Araştırma Enstitüsü) is a Turkish observatory, which is also specialized on earthquake research. It is situated in Kandilli neighborhood of Üsküdar district on the Anatolian side of Istanbul, atop a hill overlooking Bosporus.

== History ==
The observatory, named originally "Imperial Observatory" (Ottoman Turkish: رصدخانه‌يي امیره, romanized: Rasathâne-i Âmire) as established in 1868 in the Rumelian side of Istanbul, was dedicated mainly to weather forecasting and accurate timekeeping.

During the 31 March Incident in 1909, the observatory was destroyed by the rebels. Next year, however, Professor Fatin (later Fatin Gökmen) was tasked with the reestablishment of the observatory. He chose the present place as the location in of the observatory. Systematic research works began on July 1, 1911. After several name changes, the name "Kandilli Observatory, Astronomy and Geophysics" came into use in 1940. In 1982, the observatory was annexed to Boğaziçi University. Later, the institution was renamed Kandilli Observatory and Earthquake Research Institute (KOERI).

== Structure of the institution ==
Kandilli Observatory consists of following departments, laboratories and other facilities situated within its campus:

Departments

- Earthquake engineering
- Geodesy
- Geophysics

Laboratories

- Astronomy
- Geomagnetism
- Meteorology
- Optics

Other facilities

- Earthquake museum
- National Earthquake Monitoring Center
- Magnetics Monitoring Station
- Geodesy and Magnetics Monitoring Station
- Disaster Preparedness Education Unit
- Sun Tower
- Institute for Biomedical engineering
- Telecommunication and Informatics Research Center

In addition, following centers are run by the observatory outside the campus:

- Belbaşı Nuclear Tests Monitoring Center, formerly Belbaşı Seismic Research Station (Belbaşı, Ankara Province)
- İznik Center for Reducing of Earthquake Damages (Iznik Deprem Zararlarinin Azaltilmasi Merkezi) (Iznik, Bursa Province)
