= Kandal, Iraq =

Kandal کەندالێ
- Former village
- Interactive map of Kandal
- Location in Iraq
- Coordinates: 36.6197°N 43.3437°E
- Country: Iraq
- Region: Kurdistan Region
- Governorate: Dohuk Governorate
- District: Shekhan District
- Time zone: UTC+3 (AST)

Kandal (Sorani Kurdish: کەندال, romanized: Kendal, Kendalê, Kendala) is a former Yazidi village located in Shekhan district of the Duhok Governorate in Kurdistan Region, Iraq, which was destroyed in 1976 by the Iraqi government as part of Arabization policies. The inhabitants were as a result resettled in the collective town of Mahad.
