= Konidela, Nandyal district =

Konidela Konidyala
- Minor Village
- Interactive map of Konidela
- Coordinates: 15°55′35″N 78°17′05″E
- Country: India
- State: Andhra Pradesh
- District: Nandyal
- Mandal: Nandikotkur

Languages
  - Official: Telugu
- Time zone: UTC+5:30 (IST)
- PIN: 518411
- Telephone code: 08513
- Vehicle registration: AP 21
- Nearest city: Kurnool
- Lok Sabha constituency: Nandyala
- Vidhan Sabha constituency: Nandikotkur
- Climate: @! (Köppen)

Konidela is a village in the Nandikotkur mandal, Nandyal district, Andhra Pradesh, India. Population is approximately 8000 to 8500. Services include Andhra bank, telephone office, Post office, primary and secondary schools.
