= Kandilli, Üsküdar =

Kandilli
- Neighbourhood
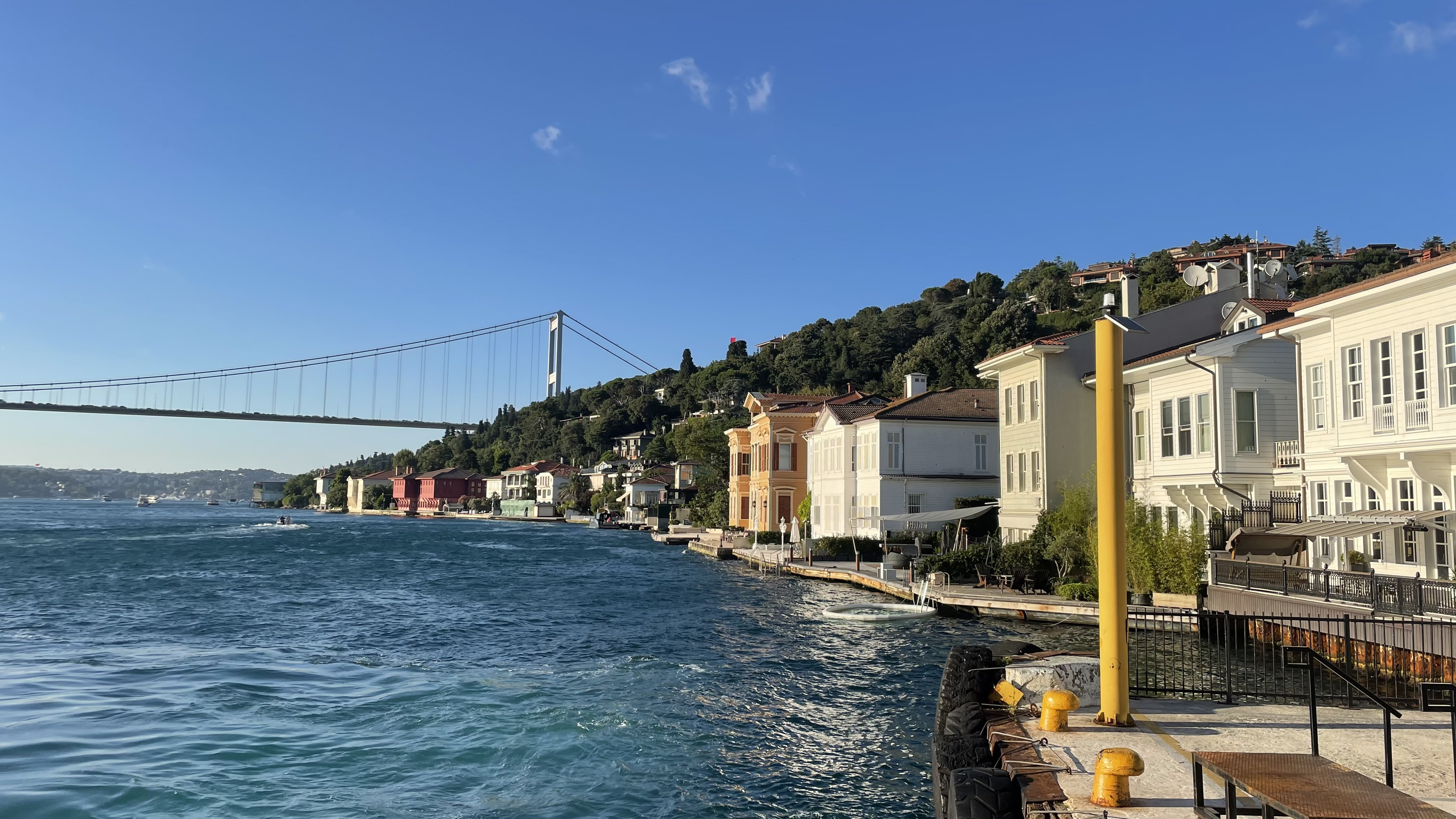
- View of Kandilli from the pier

- Location within Turkey Location within Istanbul
- Coordinates: 41°4′23″N 29°3′28″E
- Country: Turkey
- Province: Istanbul
- District: Üsküdar
- Population (2025): 1,414
- Time zone: UTC+3 (TRT)
- Area code: 0216

Kandilli is a neighbourhood in the municipality and district of Üsküdar, Istanbul Province, Turkey. Its population is 1,414 (2025).

It is located on the Asian side of the Bosphorus and is home to some of Istanbul's urban forests. The Kandilli Anatolian High School for Girls (Turkish: Kandilli Anadolu Kız Lisesi) was one of the first girl's high schools in Ottoman Turkey. The Kandilli Observatory, a facility of Boğaziçi University, is dedicated mostly to earthquake science. The Kandilli Earthquake Museum is located within the campus.

The historical waterfront Vaniköy Mosque at Vaniköy, founded in honor of Vani Mehmet Efendi, an ethnic Kurdish pasha from Van, was built in 1670 during the Ottoman period. The mosque was badly damaged by fire on 15 November 2020, caused by a short circuit.
