= Lavasan-e Bozorg Rural District =

Rural district in Tehran province, Iran

Lavasan-e Bozorg Rural District Persian: دهستان لواسان بزرگ
- Rural District
- Location within Iran
- Coordinates: 35°51′N 51°47′E
- Country: Iran
- Province: Tehran
- County: Shemiranat
- District: Lavasanat
- Established: 1987
- Capital: Lavasan-e Bozorg

Population (2016)
  - Total: 6,034
- Time zone: UTC+3:30 (IRST)

Lavasan-e Bozorg Rural District (Persian: دهستان لواسان بزرگ) is in Lavasanat District of Shemiranat County, Tehran province, Iran. Its capital is the village of Lavasan-e Bozorg.

== Demographics ==
=== Population ===
At the time of the 2006 National Census, the rural district's population was 3,873 in 1,111 households. There were 3,752 inhabitants in 1,217 households at the following census of 2011. The 2016 census measured the population of the rural district as 6,034 in 2,045 households. The most populous of its 16 villages was Niknam Deh, with 3,441 people.

=== Other villages in the rural district ===
- Alayin
- Chahar Bagh
- Kalan
- Purzand-e Vosta
- Rasanan
