= Kasur Tehsil railway station =

Railway station in Pakistan

Coordinates: 31.113611°N 74.469722°E

Kasur Junction Railway Station

General information
- Owner: Ministry of Railways
- Line: Lodhran–Raiwind Branch Line Kasur-Firozpur Branch Line

Other information
- Station code: KXS

History
- Former names: Great Indian Peninsula Railway
Location

Kasur Junction Railway Station (Urdu: قصور تحصیل ریلوے اسٹیشن) is located in Pakistan. Before Partition Kasur was Big Junction with Lines to Firozpur & Amritsar. The Amritsar Patti Railway Company Limited was a Private Company incorporated on 12 April 1905. The 27 miles (43 km) broad gauge (BG) from Amritsar to Patti opened in 1906 and worked by North Western Railway(NWR). In 1910 the line was extended to Kasur bringing the line length to 54 miles (86 km) & making Kasur a Big Junction station. The Punjab Mail from BombayMumbai to Peshawar via Bhopal, Jhansi, Agra, Delhi, Bhatinda, Firozpur, Kasur, Lahore Junction used to run through Kasur Tehsil railway station. The Train is Still running in India from BombayMumbai to Firozpur.

== See also ==
- List of railway stations in Pakistan
- Pakistan Railways
