= Rudbar-e Qasran Rural District =

Rural district in Tehran province, Iran

Rudbar-e Qasran Rural District Persian: دهستان رودبار قصران
- Rural District
- Location within Iran
- Coordinates: 35°57′N 51°32′E
- Country: Iran
- Province: Tehran
- County: Shemiranat
- District: Rudbar-e Qasran
- Established: 1987
- Capital: Hajjiabad

Population (2016)
  - Total: 7,051
- Time zone: UTC+3:30 (IRST)

Rudbar-e Qasran Rural District (Persian: دهستان رودبار قصران) is in Rudbar-e Qasran District of Shemiranat County, Tehran province, Iran. Its capital is the village of Hajjiabad.

== Demographics ==
=== Population ===
At the time of the 2006 National Census, the rural district's population was 8,594 in 2,544 households. There were 10,691 inhabitants in 3,529 households at the following census of 2011. The 2016 census measured the population of the rural district as 7,051 in 2,478 households. The most populous of its 28 villages was Ammameh, with 1,315 people.

=== Other villages in the rural district ===
- Ab Nik
- Ahar
- Garmabdar
- Lalan
- Rudak
- Ruteh
- Zayegan
