= Lavasanat District =

District in Tehran province, Iran

Lavasanat District Persian: بخش لواسانات
- District
- Location within Iran
- Coordinates: 35°54′N 51°43′E
- Country: Iran
- Province: Tehran
- County: Shemiranat
- Established: 1987
- Capital: Lavasan

Population (2016)
  - Total: 29,860
- Time zone: UTC+3:30 (IRST)

Lavasanat District (Persian: بخش لواسانات) is in Shemiranat County, Tehran province, Iran. Its capital is the city of Lavasan.

== History ==
During the Qajar era and early 20th century Lavasanat was the transit way between northern slopes of Elburz and Tehran with Great Lavasan (Lavasan-e Bozorg), Ammameh, Afjeh and Najarkala known as the most famous towns of Lavasanat.

== Demographics ==
=== Language ===
The natives of the Lavasanat District are of Caspian origin. The local dialect, or vernacular, spoken by its natives is a mix of Persian and Caspian. In the village of Ira (as well as Veskara), this vernacular approaches Mazandarani.

=== Population ===
At the time of the 2006 National Census, the district's population was 22,289 in 6,615 households. The following census in 2011 counted 25,376 people in 8,196 households. The 2016 census measured the population of the district as 29,860 inhabitants in 10,138 households.

=== Administrative divisions ===
Lavasanat District Population
Administrative Divisions	2006	2011	2016
Lavasan-e Bozorg RD	3,873	3,752	6,034
Lavasan-e Kuchak RD	2,968	5,918	5,680
Lavasan (city)	15,448	15,706	18,146
Total	22,289	25,376	29,860
RD = Rural District

== Sources ==
- Encyclopaedia Iranica (2017). LAVĀSĀN.
