= Rudbar-e Qasran District =

District in Tehran province, Iran

Rudbar-e Qasran District Persian: بخش رودبار قصران
- District
- Location within Iran
- Coordinates: 35°57′N 51°32′E
- Country: Iran
- Province: Tehran
- County: Shemiranat
- Capital: Fasham

Population (2016)
  - Total: 17,419
- Time zone: UTC+3:30 (IRST)

Rudbar-e Qasran District (Persian: بخش رودبار قصران) is in Shemiranat County, Tehran province, Iran. Its capital is the city of Fasham.

== History ==
Six villages merged in the establishment of the new city of Shemshak in 2012.

== Demographics ==
=== Population ===
At the time of the 2006 census, the district's population was 15,489 in 4,563 households. The following census in 2011 counted 18,685 people in 6,038 households. The 2016 census measured the population of the district as 17,419 inhabitants in 5,969 households.

=== Administrative divisions ===
Rudbar-e Qasran District Population
Administrative Divisions	2006	2011	2016
Rudbar-e Qasran Rural District	8,594	10,691	7,051
Fasham (city)	6,895	7,994	6,945
Shemshak (city) (Note: Merger of six villages)			3,423
Total	15,489	18,685	17,419
RD = Rural District
