= Shemiranat County =

County in Tehran province, Iran

Shemiranat County Persian: شهرستان شمیرانات
- County
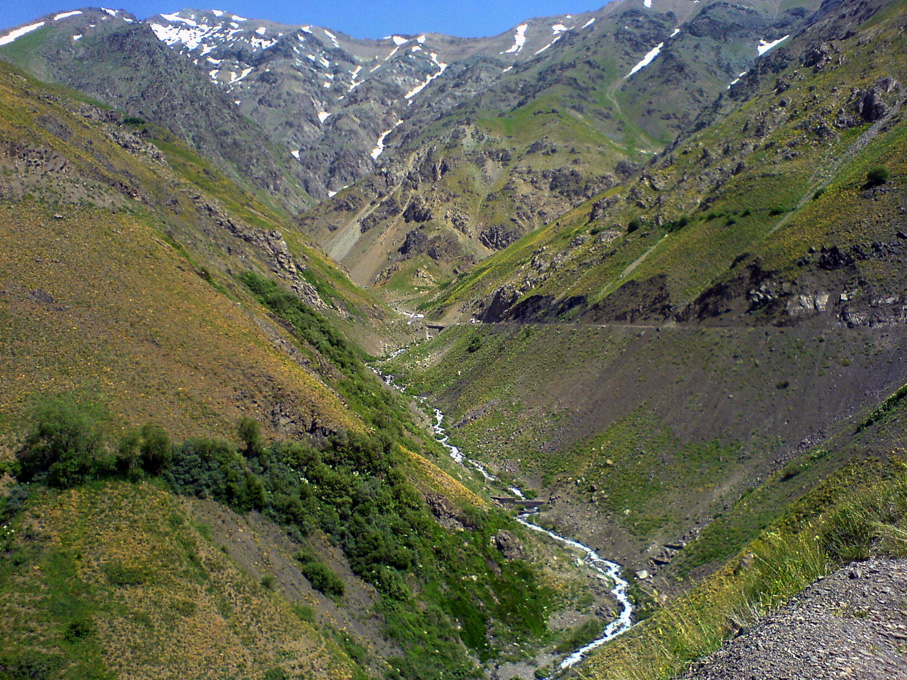
- Landscape along the Shemshak–Dizin road

- Location of Shemiranat County in Tehran province (top, green)

- Location of Tehran province in Iran
- Coordinates: 35°55′N 51°39′E
- Country: Iran
- Province: Tehran
- Established: 1987
- Capital: Tajrish
- Districts: Lavasanat, Rudbar-e Qasran

Population (2016)
  - Total: 47,279
- Time zone: UTC+3:30 (IRST)

Shemiranat County (Persian: شهرستان شمیرانات) is in Tehran province, Iran. Its capital is Tajrish.

== History ==
Six villages merged to form the new city of Shemshak in 2012.

== Demographics ==
=== Population ===
At the time of the 2006 National Census, the county's population was 37,778 in 11,178 households. The following census in 2011 counted 44,061 people in 14,227 households. The 2016 census measured the population of the county as 47,279 in 16,107 households. (Note: For census purposes, the former cities of Shemiran and Tajrish, sometimes allocated to the county, are counted in the city of Tehran, into which they have been absorbed, not in Shemiranat County)

=== Administrative divisions ===
Shemiranat County's population history and administrative structure over three consecutive censuses are shown in the following table.

Shemiranat County Population
Administrative Divisions	2006	2011	2016
Lavasanat District	22,289	25,376	29,860
Lavasan-e Bozorg RD	3,873	3,752	6,034
Lavasan-e Kuchak RD	2,968	5,918	5,680
Lavasan (city)	15,448	15,706	18,146
Rudbar-e Qasran District	15,489	18,685	17,419
Rudbar-e Qasran RD	8,594	10,691	7,051
Fasham (city)	6,895	7,994	6,945
Shemshak (city) (Note: Merger of six villages)			3,423
Total	37,778	44,061	47,279
RD = Rural District

== Climate ==
According to the information of the State Meteorological Organization of Tehran province, the long-term average annual rainfall of Shemiranat is around 569.9 mm

== See also ==
Media related to Shemiranat County at Wikimedia Commons
