= Houshmand =

Houshmand is a name. People with the name include:

- Cole Houshmand
- John Houshmand
- Farrokhlagha Houshmand
- Houshmand Almasi
- Naser Houshmand Vaziri
- Houshmand Dehghan
- Amir Mohammad Houshmand
