= Lavasan =

City in Tehran province, Iran

Lavasan Persian: لواسان
- City
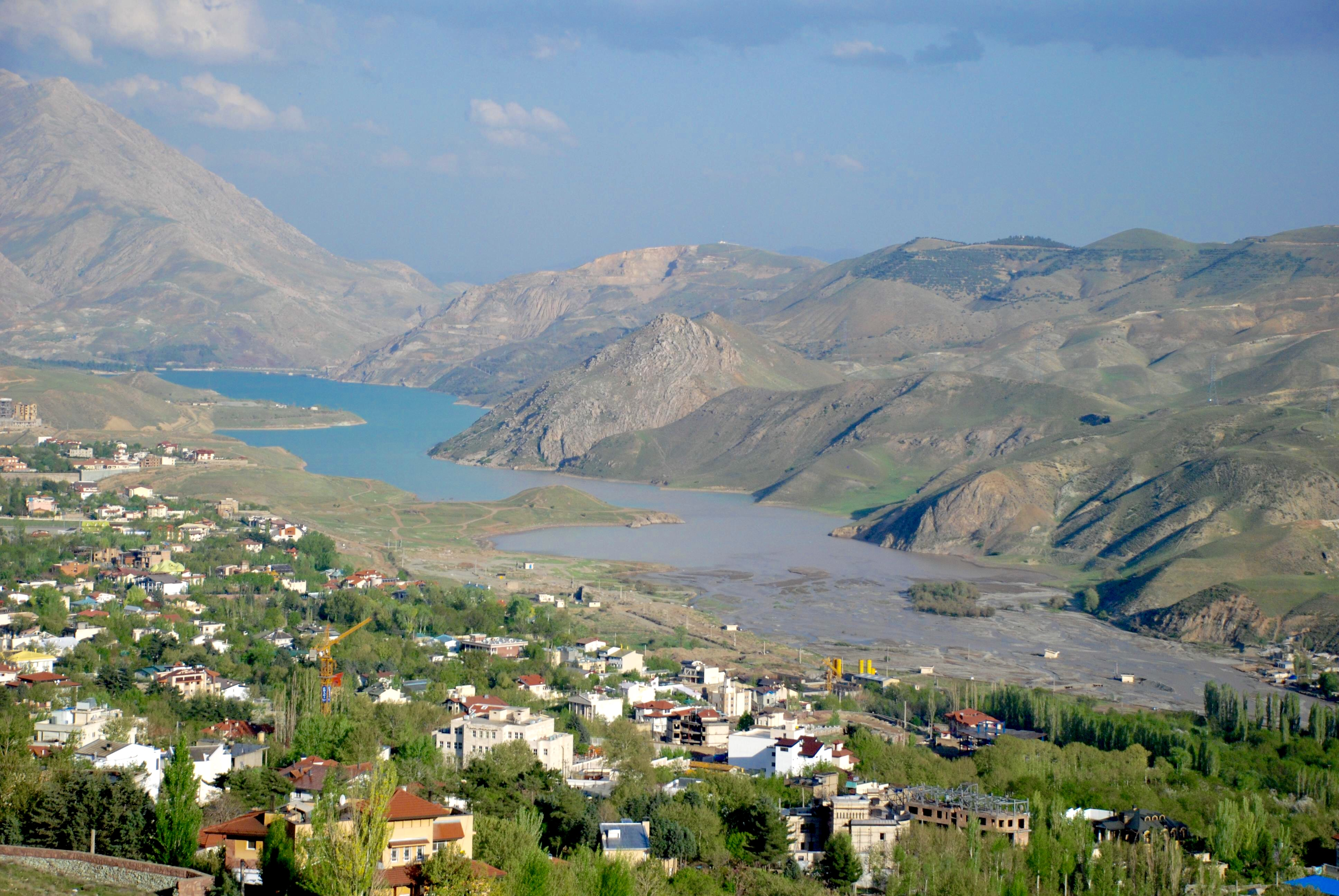
- Lavasan

- Location within Iran
- Coordinates: 35°49′15″N 51°38′03″E
- Country: Iran
- Province: Tehran
- County: Shemiranat
- District: Lavasanat

Population (2016)
  - Total: 18,146
- Time zone: UTC+3:30 (IRST)

Lavasan (Persian: لواسان) (Note: Also romanized as Lavāsān; formerly Galandovak (گلندوك), also romanized as Galandowak and Galandūak) is a city in, and the capital of, Lavasanat District in Shemiranat County, Tehran province, Iran.

== Etymology ==
The name of Lavasan is a Middle Persian (Pahlavi) word which means "The Mount Blade of Sunrise" or "Mountaintop of Sunrise". It refers to Mount Damavand that is located in the middle of the Alborz Range in the east of Lavasanat District.

== History ==
In the 19th century, during the Qajar era, Lavasan was reportedly a large village, with some 500 houses and about 200 inhabitants.

Under Mohammad Reza Pahlavi, in the 1960s, a hydroelectric dam was built in the southeast of the village which is nowadays one of the water supplies of Tehran.

In the 1980s and during the Iran–Iraq War, it became well known during the War of the cities when many people from Tehran took refuge in the nearby towns such as Lavasan.

== Demographics ==
=== Language and ethnicity ===
The natives of Lavasan are of Caspian origin. The local dialect, or vernacular, spoken by its natives is a mix of Persian and Caspian.

=== Population ===
At the time of the 2006 National Census, the city's population was 15,448 in 4,645 households. The following census in 2011 counted 15,706 people in 5,033 households. The 2016 census measured the population of the city as 18,146 people in 6,130 households.

== Geography ==
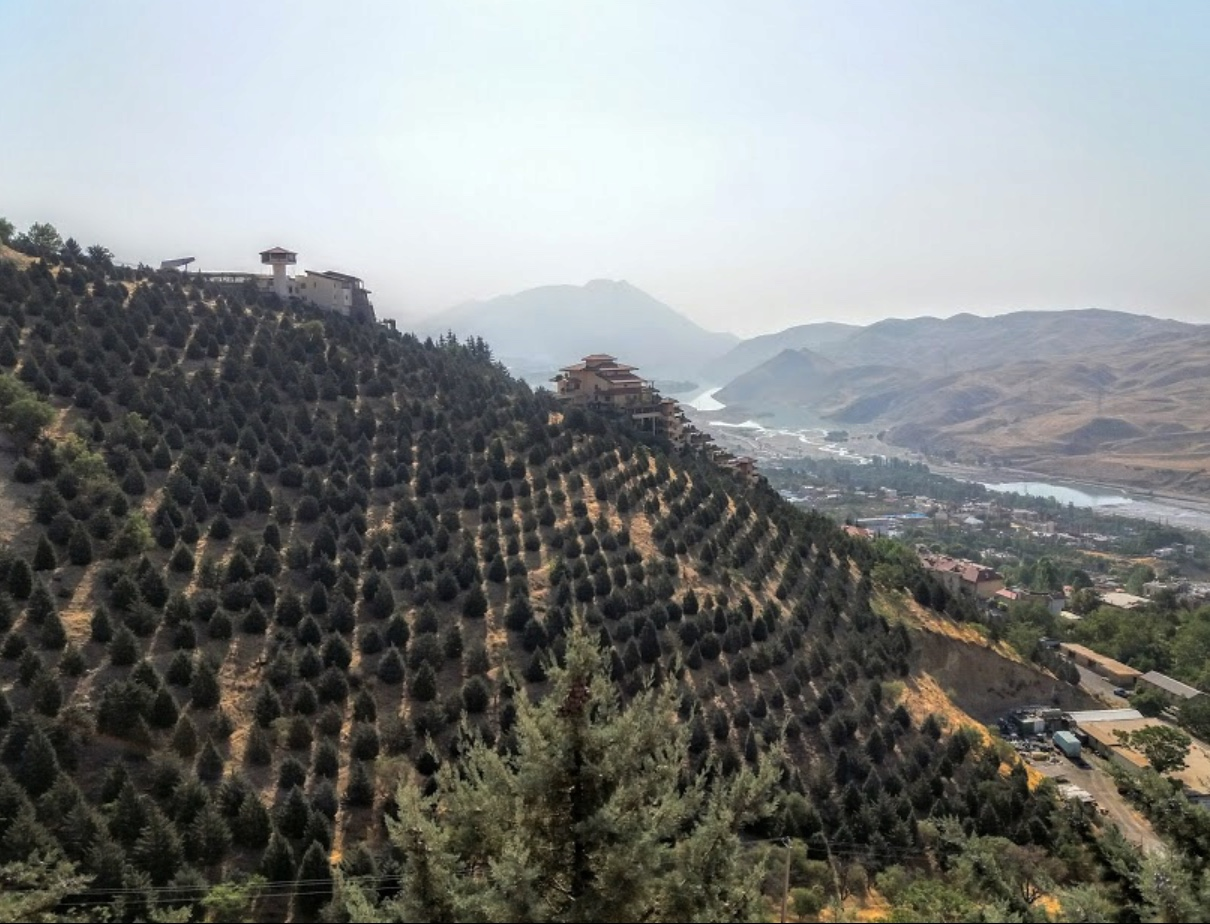
The northern heights of Lavasan

=== Location ===
Lavasan is located 11 kilometres northeast of Tehran on the slopes of Alborz with an area of 70 square kilometres (27 square miles).

=== Topography ===
The Jajrud River flows through the resort city of Lavasan, creating Latyan Dam Lake on the southeast of the city. It is situated 11 kilometers northeast of Tehran. The highrise scenery around Lavasan (with many peaks above 3000 meters) attracts lots of campers and cyclists. The city is accessed by two double lane roads (from Tajrish and Tehranpars) adjoining each other on 1930 meters Quchak Pass, then on a whirling double lane road, down to Jajrood River and Lavasan on its north bank on 1700m.

=== Climate ===
Lavasan has a cold semi-arid climate (Köppen climate classification: BSk) with significant continental influences.

Climate data for Lavasan
Month	Jan	Feb	Mar	Apr	May	Jun	Jul	Aug	Sep	Oct	Nov	Dec	Year
Mean daily maximum °C (°F)	4.5 (40.1)	7.5 (45.5)	12.5 (54.5)	19.1 (66.4)	26.3 (79.3)	31.5 (88.7)	34.4 (93.9)	33.9 (93.0)	29.5 (85.1)	22.5 (72.5)	14.1 (57.4)	7.8 (46.0)	20.3 (68.5)
Daily mean °C (°F)	−0.8 (30.6)	2.0 (35.6)	6.4 (43.5)	12.3 (54.1)	18.8 (65.8)	23.4 (74.1)	26.2 (79.2)	25.9 (78.6)	21.4 (70.5)	15.3 (59.5)	8.0 (46.4)	2.5 (36.5)	13.5 (56.2)
Mean daily minimum °C (°F)	−6.1 (21.0)	−3.5 (25.7)	0.4 (32.7)	5.5 (41.9)	11.4 (52.5)	15.3 (59.5)	18.1 (64.6)	18.0 (64.4)	13.3 (55.9)	8.1 (46.6)	1.9 (35.4)	−2.8 (27.0)	6.6 (43.9)
Average precipitation mm (inches)	30 (1.2)	27 (1.1)	32 (1.3)	28 (1.1)	18 (0.7)	4 (0.2)	2 (0.1)	1 (0.0)	1 (0.0)	8 (0.3)	15 (0.6)	21 (0.8)	187 (7.4)

== Notable people ==
- Yasser Hashemi Rafsanjani, import-export businessman, son of Akbar Hashemi Rafsanjani (president of Iran 1989–1997)
- Ali Karimi, footballer
- Ali Parvin, footballer
- Amin Hayaee, actor
- Naser Houshmand Vaziri, sculptor

== Gallery ==
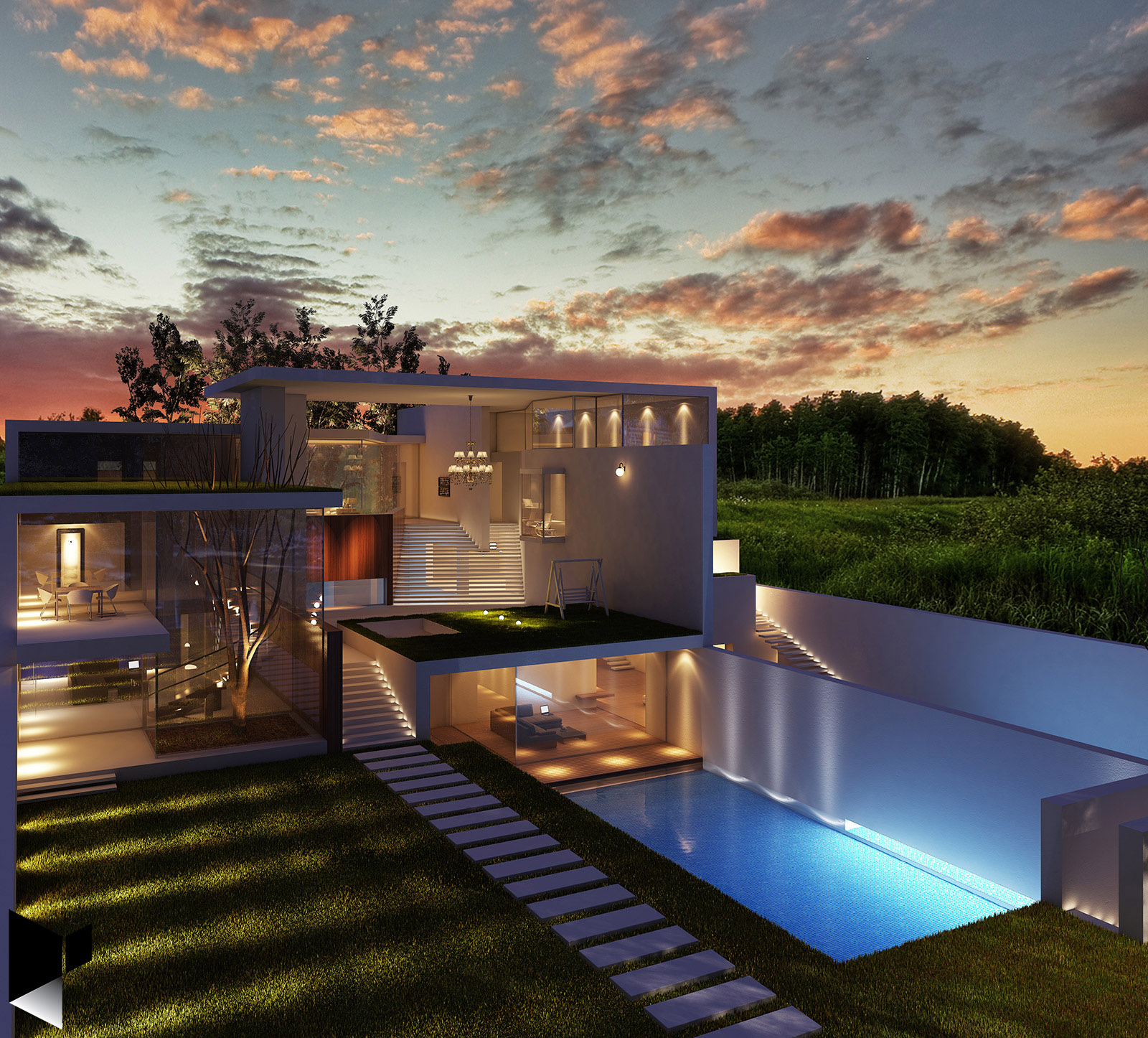

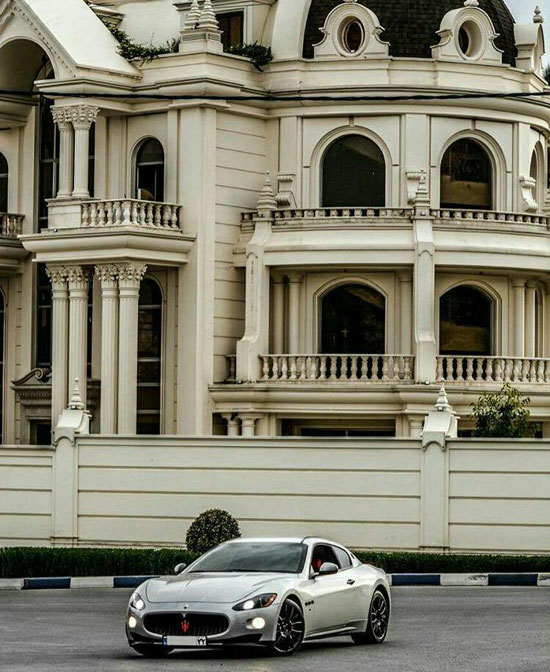

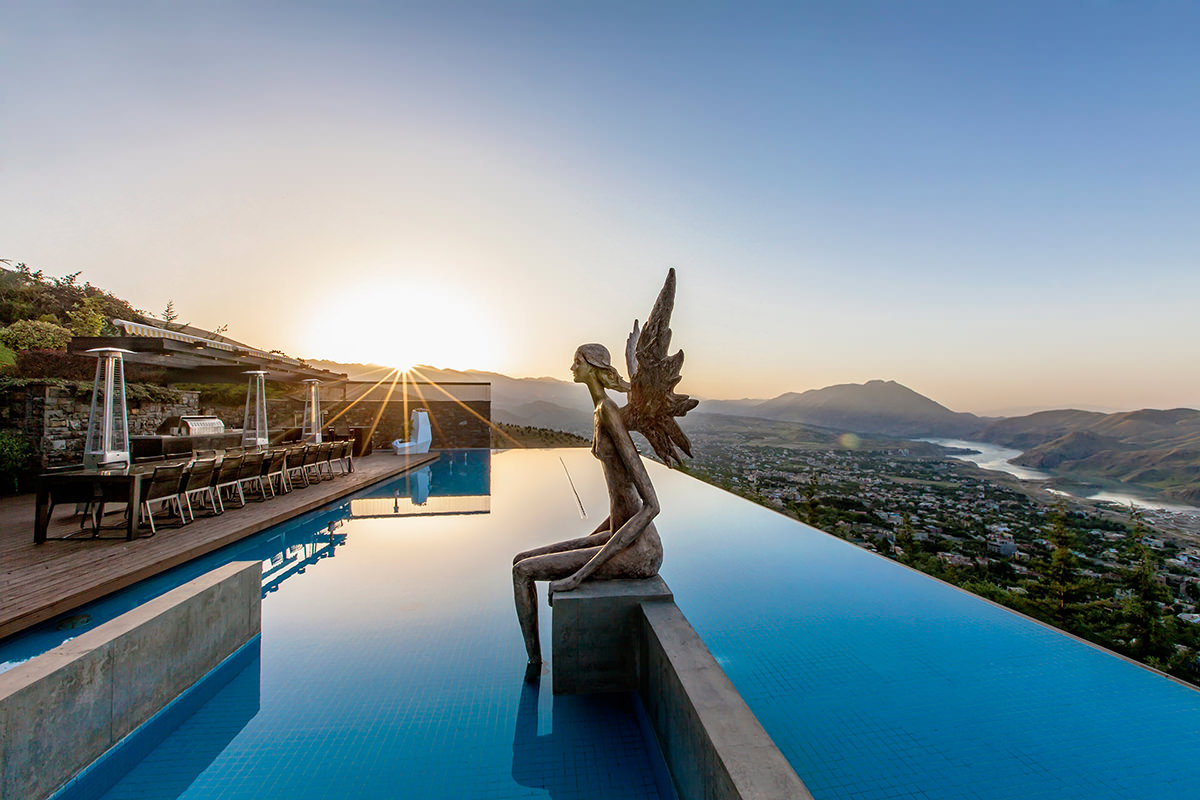

== See also ==
- Basti Hills
- Fasham
- Jajrood River
- Latyan Dam
- Lavasanat
- Shemshak

Media related to Lavasan at Wikimedia Commons

== Sources ==
- Encyclopaedia Iranica (2017). LAVĀSĀN.
