= Basti Hills =

Gated community in Tehran, Iran

Busty Hills
- Urbanite
- Basti Hills
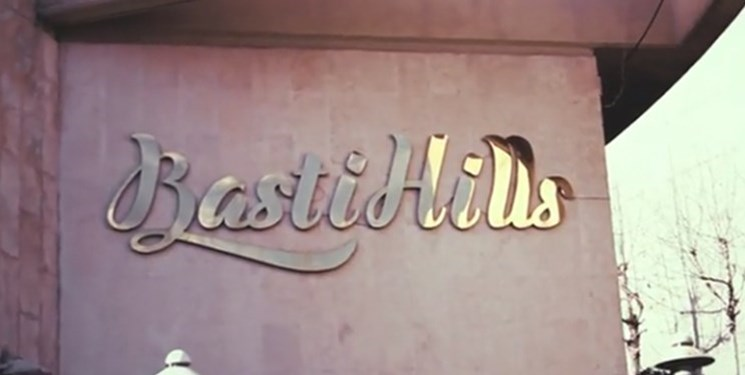
- Basti Hills in Lavasan, Tehran province
- Interactive map of Busty Hills
- Province: Tehran Province
- County: Shemiranat
- Bakhsh: Lavasanat

Basti Hills or informally Busty Hills is an Iranian gated community in Lavasan, Tehran Province, near the capital city of Tehran. It is in extension of a boulevard with some of the most expensive real estate properties around Tehran districts. Luxurious architecture and design in the town rumors it in matching the styles to that of the Hollywood celebrities' dwellings in California's Beverly Hills.

== Background ==
Historically there has been a boulevard in Lavasan known as Basti Boulevard, which also ends to the Basti Hills, which justifies the naming basis in correlation. It also bears the title of Shahrak-e Bastani-e Basti Hills, which means the "Ancient Urbanite of Basty Hills".

Traditionally being Yaylak (summer pleasure destination) of the noble residents of Tehran, nowadays it has transitioned from traditional luxury architecture to modern luxurious architecture which is appealing to real estate investors.

Due to past migrations in the wake of the adversities of the Pahlavi era, to the Beverly Hills which hosts around 8000 Iranians, later on, it gained the title of "Lavasan's Beverly Hills" as well.

== Iconic geography ==
Lavasan's Basti Hills urbanite is a private town in the hillsides of the alborz mountains situated in the north of Lavasan city. The neighboring areas are Shoorkab, Took Mazrae, and Ahmadabad, while itself is situated northwest of the Lavasan city. It is one of the most populous satellite towns of Lavasan.

Being situated over a hill provides it a full 360-degree panoramic view of all the surrounding landscapes including the greenery verdants and the Latyan Dam while the whole area faces the mountains.

It is almost in walking proximity of the Lavasan city. However it has originally been a separate region, nowadays it is a part of Lavasan situated in the highest elevation concerning the city. Basti Hills region is covering an overall area of 350 hectares.

== Urban architecture ==
Basti Hills possesses numerous facilities for pleasure and entertainment including sports clubs, recreational playing grounds, and diversified restaurants and cafes. The passage from the entry gates of the town are monitored to regulate its security.

The architectural components are influenced by European designs and in particular the architectural contributions of Dutch architects. Villas valued in the town surge from around 500 billion Iranian toman (ten millions of US dollar), and are under an exponential relative pattern.

=== Exterior and interior of villas ===
The materials used for the construction of the villas are of standards of high quality and expense, which are mainly based on the use of decorative stones and aesthetic constituents. Accordingly, its villas are called to have integrated rarest materials for the purpose of construction which are not always available in the rest of the world countries, which is pleading to higher rates of the villas in that area.

Majority of the villas having multi-story structure, their overall foundation is over 2,500 square meters, which covers the distribution of the regular facilities like swimming pools, jacuzzis, saunas, balconies, yards, parking lots, storage rooms, terrace, and sports halls. The interiors are sometimes tagged as to be exceptional in design. The villas are known to be replicas of the historic royal palaces which bare a sense of nostalgia as well. The internal decorations are based on recent modern trends.

== Residents lifestyle ==
The lifestyle of its residents have gained the attention of the general public in Iran. The lavish lifestyle of the residents is a matter of argument that benefits from negligence and pardon in contrast to the governing laws, in many cases the attested norms are examined beyond the legal definitions.

The dominance of controversies about Basti Hills encircles around the presence of individuals with ties to the government with unspecified sources of wealth, whom in contrary to their religious grounds, rejoice in the Western lifestyle. The children of government officials are also sometimes coined in this regard, under the term of Aghazadeh.

The exemptive practice of outlawed liberties by the wealthy and its bilateral symmetry to that of the Beverly Hills pictures it in correlation to the umbrella term of the American Dream.

Basti Hills is known to be the host of notable celebrities and characters, while some coin it with the dwelling place of the noble wealthy in contrast. It is also one of the residence and tourist spots of the Tehran city.

== Controversies ==
It was locked down for some time due to a municipality order, but its gates were removed in 2018. There has been multiple cases of environmental pleads against the establishment in the past years.

While the government's influence tries to undermine the significance of its challenging sociocultural aspects in coverage, some experts based on economic aspects have asserted the design similarities of the Basti Hills and the Beverly Hills in conjunction.

== See also ==
- Rich Kids of Tehran
