= Lar Dam =

Dam in Iran

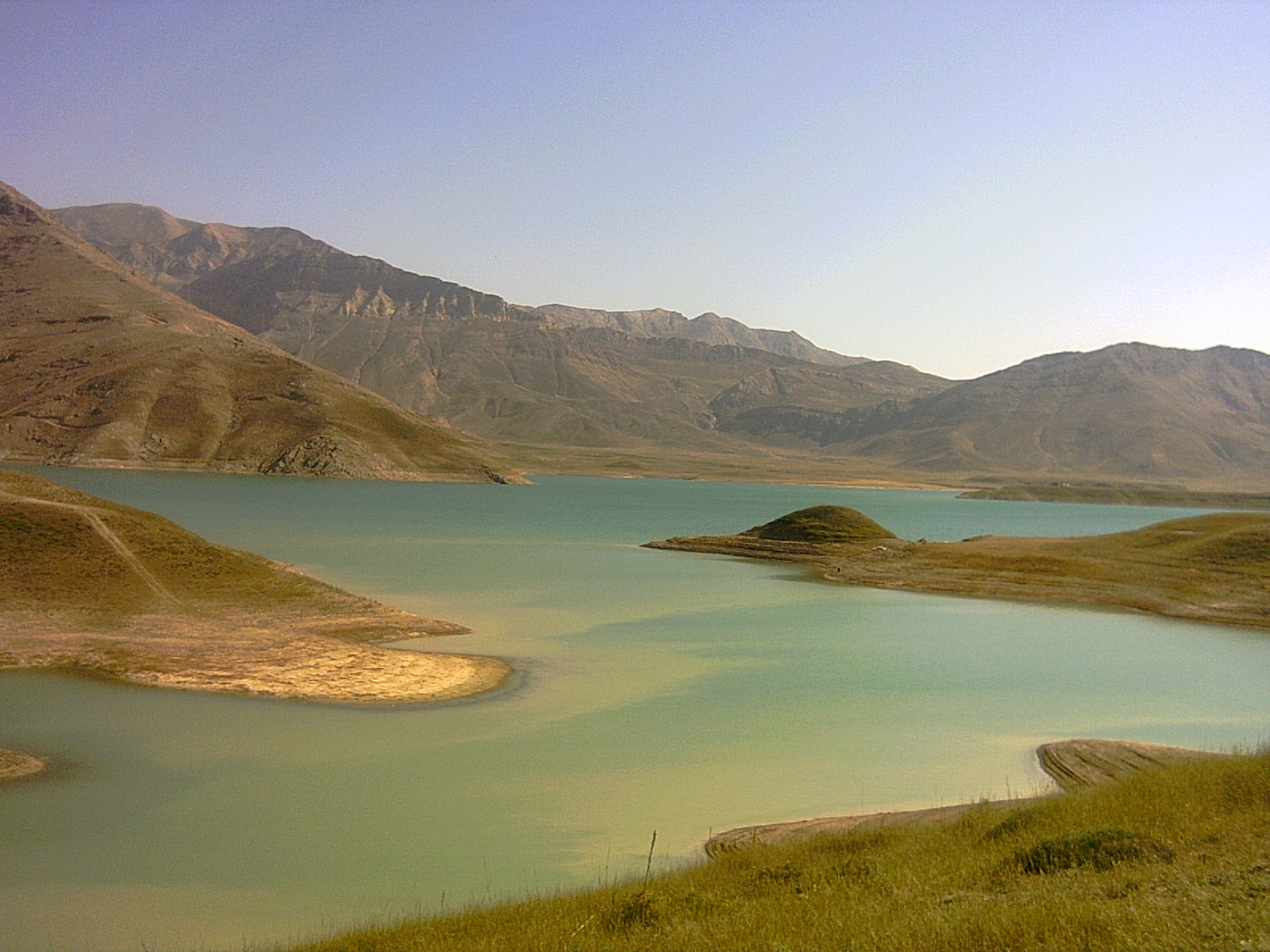
- Lar Lake

- Location within Iran
- Interactive map of Lar Dam
- Country: Iran
- Location: Mazandaran, Amol county
- Purpose: Water supply, power
- Status: Operational
- Construction began: 1974
- Opening date: 1982
- Owner: Regional Water Company

Dam and spillways
- Impounds: Lar river
- Height: 105 m (344 ft)
- Length: 1,150 m (3,773 ft)
- Width (crest): 13 m (43 ft)
- Width (base): 800 m (2,625 ft)
- Spillway capacity: 1,160 m^{3}/s (41,000 cu ft/s)

Reservoir
- Total capacity: 960,000,000 m^{3} (778,285 acre⋅ft)

Power Station
- Commission date: Kalan: 1998; Lavarak: 2012-2013
- Turbines: Kalan: 3 x 38.5 MW Francis-type; Lavarak: 2 x 23.5 MW Francis-type
- Installed capacity: Kalan: 115.5 MW; Lavarak: 47 MW
- Website https://thrw.ir/st/73

Lar Dam (Persian: سد لار, romanized: sadd-e lār) is a dam located at the foot of Mount Damavand in Amol county, Mazandaran, Iran. The dam is located within the protected Lar National Park Amol. The primary purpose of the dam is municipal water supply to Tehran but prior to the water reaching the city filtration plant, it is used to power the Kalan and Lavarak Hydroelectric Power Stations, with a combined installed capacity of 162.5 MW.

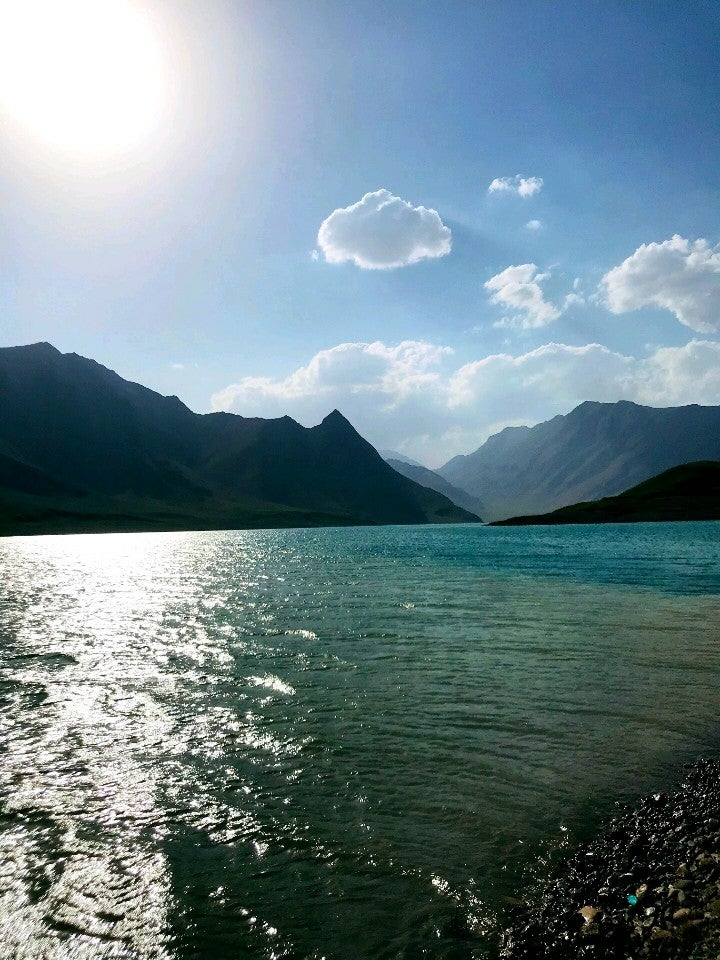
Laar Dam Lake in Amol

== Construction ==
Lar Dam bridge
- Coordinates: 35°53′21″N 51°59′48″E

Characteristics
- Width: 13 m (43 ft)

Location
- Interactive map of Lar Dam bridge

The construction began on the dam in 1974, and ended four years later in 1981. When the reservoir began in 1980, leakage was discovered downstream. The leakage is due to a karst foundation. The foundation was grouted from 1983 until 1989 with no success. With the population growth occurring in Amol, there was a need for more water and energy. The ideal place for the dam was over the Lar river, in the northeast section of the city, at the elevated heights of the Kalanbasteh mountain on the slope of Mount Damavand. The area is called Polur, and operations began in 1984.

One of the aims for building the Lar dam was to supply part of Amol with drinking water; it was not possible initially to operate the dam at its nominal capacity, because of a water seepage problem. Water stored in the dam's reservoir is first transferred to the Kalan Power Station (35°48′24.87″N 51°47′29.46″E) then to the Lavark Power Station (35°48′34.97″N 51°44′54.67″E), a distance of 3 kilometers from the Latyan Dam's reservoir, through the 20 kilometer long Kalan tunnel (3 meters in size). After electricity generation, the water joins and feeds the Latyan dam's reservoir. The Kalan Power Station was commissioned in 1998 and the Lavarak in March 2012 and July 2013. Uncontrolled growth and expansion of Tehran created a situation where the existing water resources at Karaj, Latyan and Lar dams and the deep wells which were supposed to be exploited only in the during the peak water consumption period. These were no longer capable of meeting the city's water demand, so inevitable abstraction from ground resources started to increase in a manner that at the present situation, the quantity of drilled deep wells has amounted to 230 rings. In fact, from 1997 to 2000, it had been orderly abstracted, 317, 289, 374 and 357 MCM (million cubic metres) of water from groundwater resources of the city.

== Lake ==
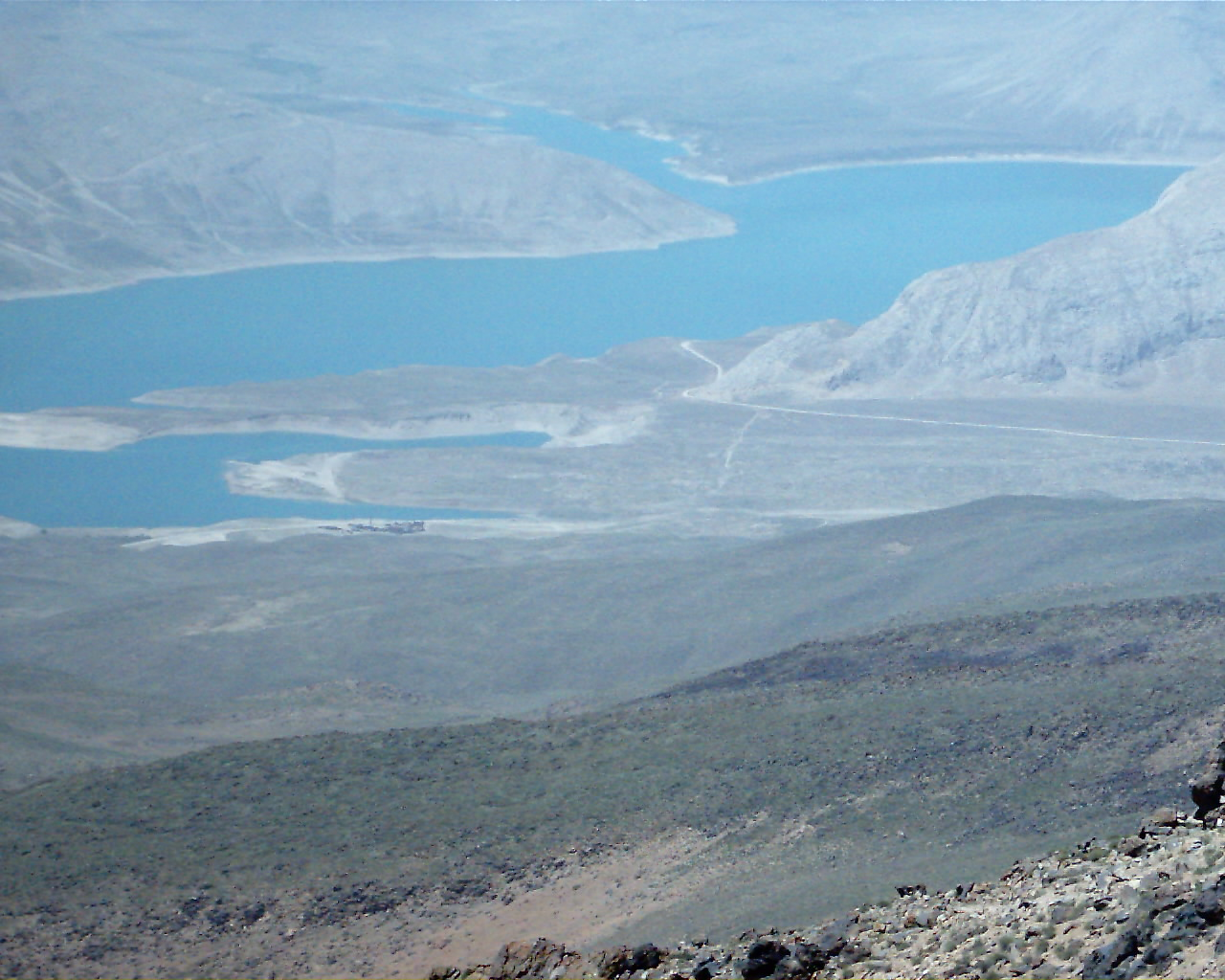
Lar lake from Damavand mountain.

The lake is 94 km (58 mi) northeast of Amol.

== See also ==
List of dams and reservoirs in Iran
