= Naser Houshmand Vaziri =

Iranian sculptor 1946–2019

Nāser Houshmand Vaziri (Persian: ناصر هوشمند وزیری, born 1946 in Hamadan, Iran; died 28 June 2019 in Tehran) was an Iranian sculptor.

== Biography ==
Naser Houshmand Vaziri was born in 1946 in Hamedan, Pahlavi Iran. At the age of five he moved with his parents to Tehran. He considered his mother as the single most important influence on him as well as his artistic life. He was a graduate of the fine arts faculty of University of Tehran.

After graduating from university, Vaziri began to work in his sculpting studio on Fātemi Street in Tehran. He continued to work in this location for over thirty years. Around 2005 he closed this studio and moved to Lavāsān, in the Lavasanat District, in the northeast of Tehran, where he works on his life-dream, turning his home and surroundings into a workshop and an in-and-outdoor art museum. He was further digging a tunnel into the mountain, hoping to reach a natural tunnel in the process. In doing so, he was simultaneously turning the dug tunnel into a museum of arts. He intended also to create, amongst other things, the real-size sculptures of all the mythical heroes of Ferdowsi's Shahnameh.

Vaziri was the creator of twenty-five of the real-size sculptures that have been installed in the Laundry Museum of Zanjān and of the thirty sculptures of the Bagh-e Ferdowsi (The Garden of Ferdowsi) in northern Tehran.

Although stone was his favorite material, he worked with such other substances as mud, wood, sand, glass, fibreglass, ceramic, metal and cement. He worked both in classical and modern styles of sculpting. He was further a taxidermist. The sculptor and painter Roksānā Houshmand Vaziri and the physicist and sculptor Rāmā Houshmand Vaziri are daughters of Nāser Houshmand Vaziri.

Nāser Houshmand Vaziri died of a heart attack on Friday, 28 June 2019, he was 73, the Association of Iranian Sculptors announced.
