= John Houshmand =

American furniture maker

John Houshmand (born 1954) is an American furniture maker, sculptor, musician, and contractor. He has an atelier in New York's Catskill Mountains. He has been described as a contemporary designer who uses "massive upended split logs" in the style of George Nakashima.

== Early life and education ==
John Houshmand was born to a Dutch-American mother and an Iranian father. He attended Yale University and received a BA degree in 1978.

== Career ==
Houshmand's designs "often juxtapose massive chunks of wood with thick glass panes" and are made by his staff on a 950-acre (3.8 km^{2}) farm that is "also home to the company sawmill and the 1,700 slabs he keeps on hand for inspiration." He has a showroom in Manhattan and travels to meet clients for custom orders on tables that can cost about $12,000 USD in 2009. He "has been a photographer, a musician, and a partner in high-end residential construction" and now makes "one-of-a-kind sculptural furniture out of planks, slabs, and even trunks of reclaimed American hardwood like black walnut and elm."

== Personal life ==
He bought the remote ranch property for $300,000 in 1991.

== Discography ==
- Lost Melodies, Volume 1: Remembering (2026)
- The End of the Road: Five Sketches (2024)
- Beat Noir, Patrick S. Noonan (1996)
- Void of Course, John Houshmand & 10 Martian Boys (1994)
- Undiscovered Country, Laurasia (1988)
- East River Consort, Laurasia (1978)
- Noonan, Levi & Houshmand, Laurasia (1975)
