= Candle (disambiguation) =

A candle is a source of light, typically made of wax.

Candle may also refer to:

== Places ==
- Candle, Alaska
- Candle Lake (Saskatchewan), Canada

== Art, media, and entertainment ==
=== Literature ===
- Candle (novel), 2000 novel by John Barnes

=== Music ===
==== Artists and labels ====
- Candle (band), American Christian rock band
- Candle Records, Australian record label

==== Albums and EPs ====
- Candles (album), 1980 album by Heatwave
- Candles (EP), a 2011 EP by Hey Monday

==== Songs ====
- "Candle" (Guy Sebastian song), 2016
- "Candle" (Jason McCoy song), 1995
- "Candle (Sick and Tired)", 2008 song by The White Tie Affair
- "Candle" (Skinny Puppy song), 1996
- "Candle", a 1988 song by Sonic Youth from the album Daydream Nation
- "Candles" (song), a song by Hey Monday 2011
- "Candles", 1996 single by Alex Reece
- "Candles", a song by King Gizzard & the Lizard Wizard from Omnium Gatherum
- "Candle", a song from "Fool's Mate", debut solo album by Peter Hammill, 1971

=== Video games ===
- Candleman, a 2014 video game

== Enterprises ==
- Center for the Advancement of Natural Discoveries using Light Emission (CANDLE), Synchrotron radiation facility project in Armenia
- Candle Corporation, software company that was acquired by IBM

== Measurement and timekeeping ==
- Candle (unit), old unit of luminous intensity, now replaced by the SI unit candela
- Advent candle
- Candle clock
- Candling, method of observing the growth of an embryo inside an egg, using a bright light source

== Nature ==
- Candle Hap, a species of freshwater fish found in Africa
- Candle ice, a form of rotten ice that develops in columns perpendicular to the surface of a lake

== Other uses ==
- Candle tree (disambiguation)

== See also ==
- Candlelight (disambiguation)
- Candler (disambiguation)
- CANDLES Holocaust Museum and Education Center in Terre Haute, Indiana
- Roman candle (firework)
- Kandle (disambiguation)
- Candel (disambiguation)
- Cadle (disambiguation)
