= Cadle (disambiguation) =

Cadle may refer to:

== People ==
Notable people with this surname (and occasional given name) include:

- Andrew Cadle (1864–1938), South African cricketer
- Brian Cadle (1948–2015), Canadian ice hockey player
- George Cadle (1948–2015), American golfer
- Giles Cadle, British set designer
- E. Howard Cadle (1884–1942), American evangelist
- Kevin Cadle (1955–2017), British-based American sports presenter
- Richard Fish Cadle (1796–1857), American Episcopalian priest
- Scott Cadle (in office 2012–2016/2018–2020), American politician
- George Cadle Price (1919–2011), Belizean statesman

== Places ==
- Cadle, Swansea, Wales, a suburban area near Fforestfach
- Cadle Monolith, a rock monolith in Antarctica

== Other ==
- Cadle Mission, an Episcopal boarding school in Wisconsin
- Cadle Tabernacle, a former church in Indianapolis

== See also ==
- Cadley (disambiguation)
- Candle (disambiguation)
