= Cadley (disambiguation) =

Cadley can refer to:

- Cadley, Lancashire, a suburb of Preston, England
- Cadley, Collingbourne Ducis, Wiltshire, England
- Cadley, Savernake, Wiltshire, England
- Cadley, Georgia, an unincorporated community, Georgia, United States

== See also ==
- Cadle (disambiguation)
