= Justice Candler =

Justice Candler may refer to:

- John S. Candler (1861–1941), associate justice of the Supreme Court of Georgia
- Thomas S. Candler (1890–1971), associate justice of the Supreme Court of Georgia
