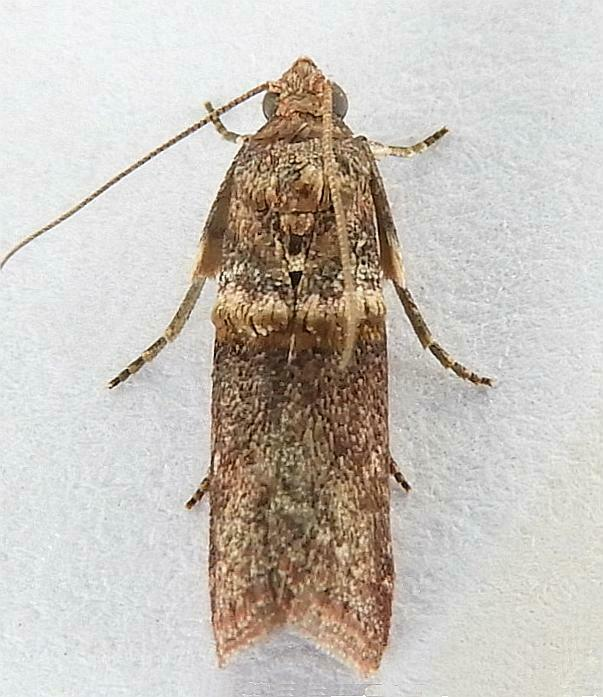

Scientific classification
- Kingdom: Animalia
- Phylum: Arthropoda
- Clade: Pancrustacea
- Class: Insecta
- Order: Lepidoptera
- Family: Pyralidae
- Genus: Anabasis
- Species: A. ochrodesma

Binomial name
- Anabasis ochrodesma (Zeller, 1881)

Synonyms
- Myelois ochrodesma Zeller, 1881; Acrobasis crassiquamella Hampson, 1901

= Anabasis ochrodesma =

Species of moth

Anabasis ochrodesma, the cassia webworm, is a species of snout moth. It was described by Philipp Christoph Zeller in 1881. It is found from Florida through Puerto Rico, the Virgin Islands, Cuba, Grenada, Jamaica, Trinidad, Mexico, Guatemala and Panama to Colombia and Venezuela.

Adults are on wing year round in several generations per year.

The larvae feed on Cassia species, including Cassia obtusifolia, Cassia alata, Cassia bahamensis, Cassia fistula, Cassia javanica and Cassia siamea. Young larvae bore in the terminal shoots of the host plant. Later, they bind together several leaflets with silk to form a flat shelter. They feed on the inner epidermis and mesophyll of these leaflets from within their shelter. Several larvae may be found in a single shelter.
