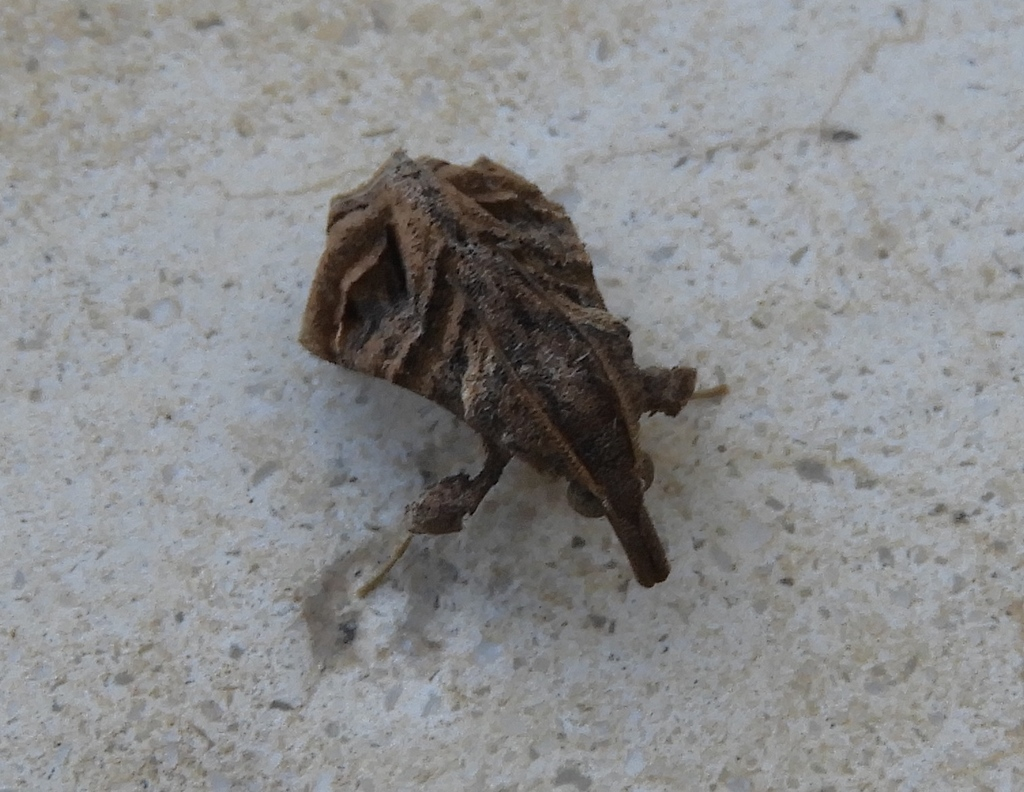

Scientific classification
- Kingdom: Animalia
- Phylum: Arthropoda
- Class: Insecta
- Order: Lepidoptera
- Family: Pyralidae
- Genus: Bonchis
- Species: B. munitalis

Binomial name
- Bonchis munitalis (Lederer, 1863)

Synonyms
- Ethnistis munitalis Lederer, 1863; Vurna instructalis Walker, [1866]; Zarania cossalis Walker, [1866]; Gazaca dirutalis Walker, [1866]

= Bonchis munitalis =

Species of moth

Bonchis munitalis is a species of snout moth in the genus Bonchis. It was described by Julius Lederer in 1863, and is known from Honduras, the Dominican Republic, Brazil and Venezuela. It is also found in the southern United States, including Florida. Adults of this species were found in the month of October. Host plants include, Crescentia cujeta, Parmentiera cereifera, and Tabebuia rosea.
