= Kandle =

Kandle may refer to:

- Kandle, Estonia, a village
- Kandle (musician) (b. 1990), Canadian singer and songwriter
- Victor L. Kandle (1921–1944), American army officer

== See also ==
- Kandel (disambiguation)
- Candle (disambiguation)
