= Candler =

Candler may refer to:

== People ==
- Candler (surname)

== Places ==
- Candler, Florida, an unincorporated town in Marion County
- Candler, Georgia, an unincorporated community
- Candler, North Carolina, an unincorporated town in Buncombe County
- Candler County, Georgia, a county located in the U.S. state of Georgia
- Candler-McAfee, Georgia, a census-designated place in DeKalb County
- Candler Building (disambiguation), various
- Candler Field, a former name for Hartsfield-Jackson Atlanta International Airport, in honor of Mayor Asa Griggs Candler
- Candler Hospital in Savannah, a Methodist hospital which merged in 1997 to become St. Joseph's/Candler
- Candler Park, a park in Atlanta, Georgia; also, the historic neighborhood which surrounds the park
- Candler School of Theology, one of 13 seminaries of the United Methodist Church and named for Bishop Warren Akin Candler

== Other ==
- "Candler", a traditional Scottish tune used as the melody for the hymn "Come, O Thou Traveler Unknown"

== See also ==
- Atlantic Southeast Airlines, based in Atlanta, Georgia, USA, whose former call sign was "Candler"
- Candling
