= Parmentiera edulis =

Parmentiera edulis may be a synonym of two separate plant species:

- Parmentiera aculeata (Parmentiera edulis DC.), native to Mexico and Central America
- Solanum tuberosum (Parmentiera edulis Raf.), the potato, cultivated worldwide
