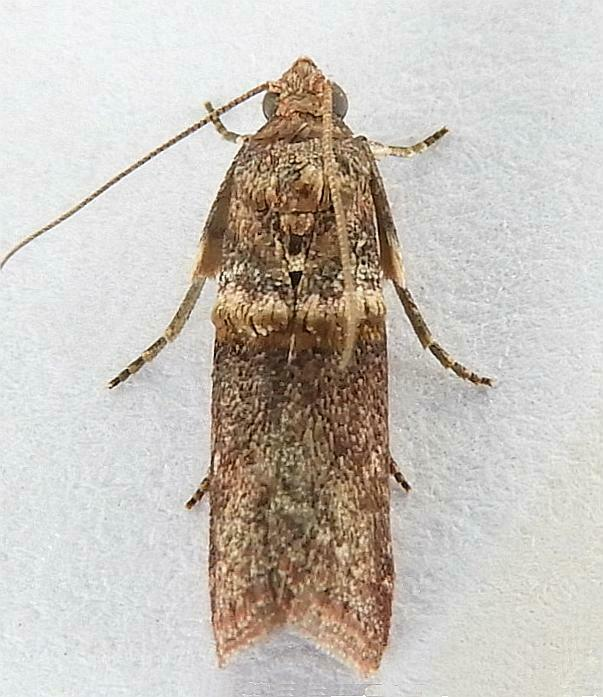
- Anabasis ochrodesma

Scientific classification
- Kingdom: Animalia
- Phylum: Arthropoda
- Class: Insecta
- Order: Lepidoptera
- Family: Pyralidae
- Subfamily: Phycitinae
- Genus: Anabasis; Heinrich, 1956

= Anabasis (moth) =

Genus of moths

Anabasis is a genus of snout moths. It was described by Carl Heinrich in 1956. The genus was long thought to contain only one species, the cassia webworm (Anabasis ochrodesma).

== Species ==
- Anabasis flusciflavida Du, Song & Wu, 2005 (southern China)
- Anabasis impecuniosa (Joannis, 1927) (from Mozambique)
- Anabasis infusella Meyrick (southern China)
- Anabasis medogia H.H. Li & Y.D. Ren, 2010 (from China)
- Anabasis ochrodesma (Zeller, 1881) (from North America)
- Anabasis prompta Y.L. Du, S.M. Song & C.S. Wu, 2009 (from China)
- Anabasis zhengi L.X. Li & H.H. Li, 2011 (from China)
