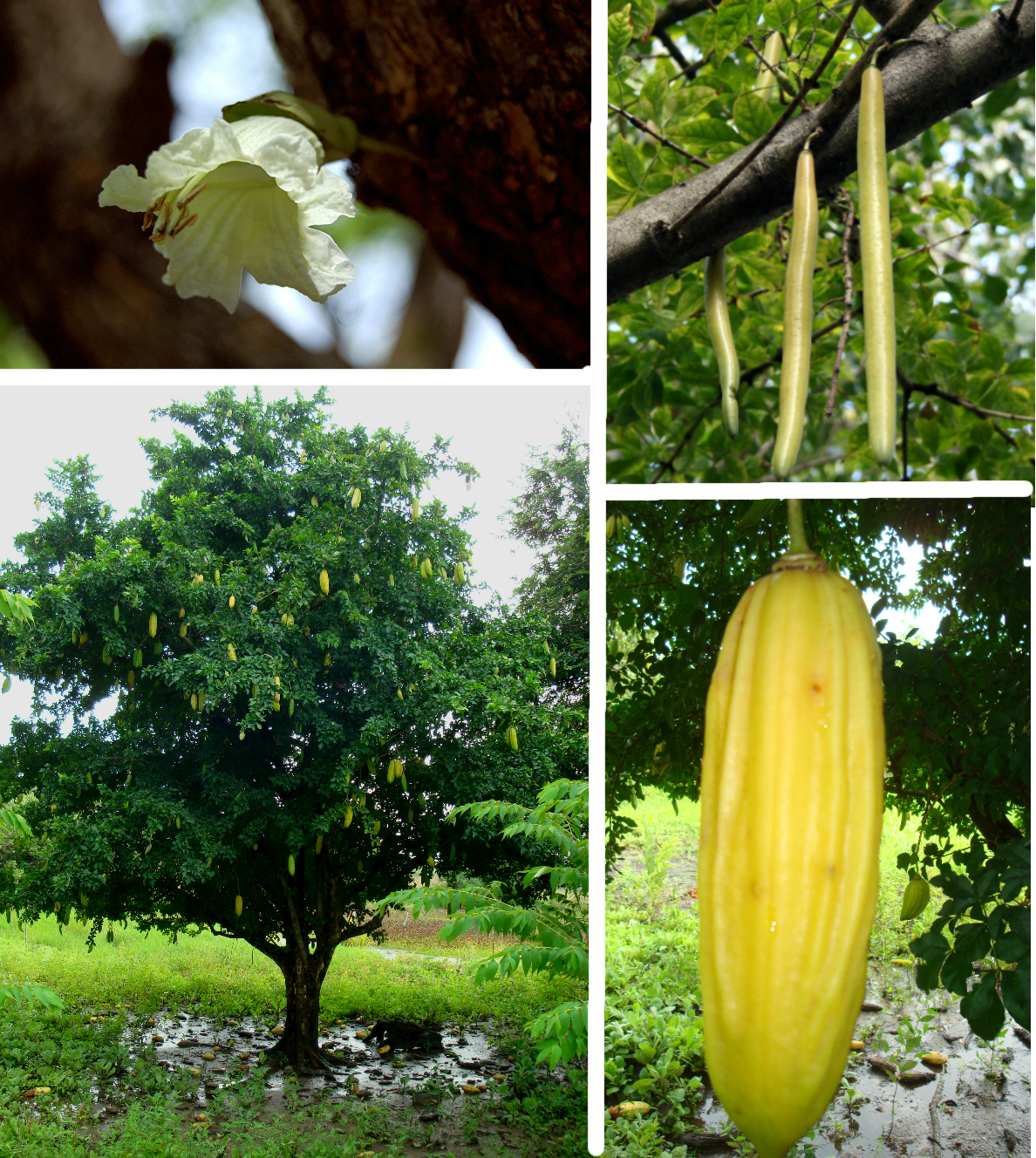
- Parmentiera: habit, flower, and fruits from 2 species

Scientific classification
- Kingdom: Plantae
- Clade: Tracheophytes
- Clade: Angiosperms
- Clade: Eudicots
- Clade: Asterids
- Order: Lamiales
- Family: Bignoniaceae
- Clade: Crescentiina
- Clade: Tabebuia alliance
- Tribe: Crescentieae
- Genus: Parmentiera; DC.

Species
- See text

Synonyms
- Zenkeria Rchb.

= Parmentiera =

Genus of flowering plants

Parmentiera is a genus of plants in the family Bignoniaceae.

Species include:

- Parmentiera aculeata (Kunth) L. O. Williams — guajilote (Mexico, Guatemala, Honduras, Costa Rica, Belize, El Salvador, Nicaragua)
- Parmentiera cereifera Seem. — candle tree (Panama)
- Parmentiera dressleri A. H. Gentry (Panama, Costa Rica)
- Parmentiera macrophylla Standl. (Costa Rica, Panama, Nicaragua)
- Parmentiera millspaughiana L. O. Williams (Mexico, Nicaragua)
- Parmentiera morii A. H. Gentry (Panama)
- Parmentiera parviflora Lundell (Mexico, Guatemala)
- Parmentiera stenocarpa Dugand & L. B. Sm. (Colombia)
- Parmentiera trunciflora Standl. & L. O. Williams (Nicaragua)
- Parmentiera valerii Standl. (Costa Rica)
