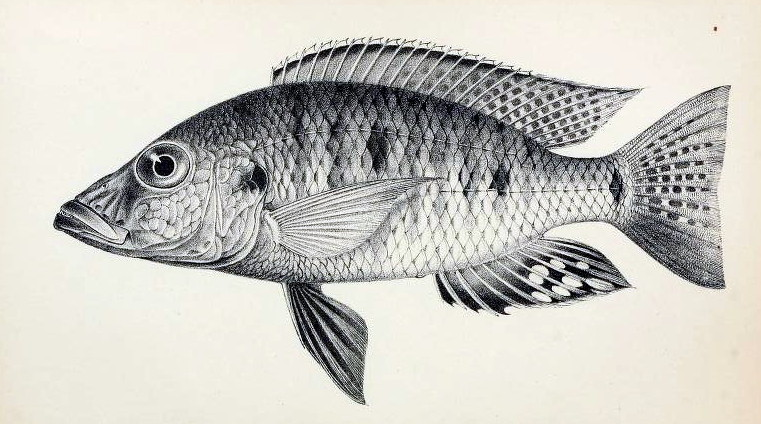
- Stigmatochromis woodi

Scientific classification
- Kingdom: Animalia
- Phylum: Chordata
- Class: Actinopterygii
- Order: Cichliformes
- Family: Cichlidae
- Tribe: Haplochromini
- Genus: Stigmatochromis; Eccles & Trewavas, 1989

Type species
- Haplochromis woodi Regan, 1922

= Stigmatochromis =

Genus of fishes

Stigmatochromis is a small genus of haplochromine cichlids that are endemic to Lake Malawi in East Africa.

== Species ==
There are currently six recognized species in this genus:

- Stigmatochromis macrorhynchos Stauffer, Cleaver-Yoder & Konings, 2011
- Stigmatochromis melanchros Stauffer, Cleaver-Yoder & Konings, 2011
- Stigmatochromis modestus (Günther, 1894)
- Stigmatochromis pholidophorus (Trewavas, 1935) (Candle Hap)
- Stigmatochromis pleurospilus (Trewavas, 1935)
- Stigmatochromis woodi (Regan, 1922)
