= Bonchis scoparioides =

Scientific classification
- Kingdom: Animalia
- Phylum: Arthropoda
- Class: Insecta
- Order: Lepidoptera
- Family: Pyralidae
- Genus: Bonchis
- Species: B. scoparioides

Binomial name
- Bonchis scoparioides Walker, 1862

Species of moth

Bonchis scoparioides is a species of snout moth in the genus Bonchis. It was described by Francis Walker in 1862. It is found in Pará, Brazil.
