= Anabasis zhengi =

Scientific classification
- Domain: Eukaryota
- Kingdom: Animalia
- Phylum: Arthropoda
- Class: Insecta
- Order: Lepidoptera
- Family: Pyralidae
- Genus: Anabasis
- Species: A. zhengi

Binomial name
- Anabasis zhengi L.X. Li & H.H. Li, 2011

Species of moth

Anabasis zhengi is a species of snout moth. It was described by L.X. Li and H.H. Li in 2011. It is found in China (Yunnan).
