= Candler (surname) =

Candler is a surname. Notable people with the surname include:

- Allen D. Candler (1834–1910), governor of Georgia (U.S. state) at the turn of the 20th century
- Asa Griggs Candler (1851–1929), founder of the Coca-Cola Company and mayor of Atlanta
- Asa G. Candler Jr. (1880–1953), American businessman and real-estate developer
- Ezekiel S. Candler Jr. (1862–1944), American politician
- Gillian Candler (born 1959), New Zealand writer, teacher, publisher and conservationist
- John S. Candler (1861–1941), American colonel and justice of the Supreme Court of Georgia
- John W. Candler (1828–1903), American politician
- Kat Candler (born 1974), American independent filmmaker
- Milton A. Candler (1837–1909), American politician & lawyer; brother of Asa Griggs Candler
- Paul Candler, British civil servant
- Thomas S. Candler (1890–1971), justice of the Supreme Court of Georgia
- Warren Akin Candler (1857–1941), American Bishop of the Methodist Episcopal Church, South; brother of Asa Griggs Candler
