= Bonchis glanysis =

Scientific classification
- Domain: Eukaryota
- Kingdom: Animalia
- Phylum: Arthropoda
- Class: Insecta
- Order: Lepidoptera
- Family: Pyralidae
- Genus: Bonchis
- Species: B. glanysis

Binomial name
- Bonchis glanysis Dyar, 1914

Species of moth

Bonchis glanysis is a species of snout moth in the genus Bonchis. It was described by Harrison Gray Dyar Jr. in 1914, and is known from Panama.
