= Bonchis =

Scientific classification
- Kingdom: Animalia
- Phylum: Arthropoda
- Class: Insecta
- Order: Lepidoptera
- Family: Pyralidae
- Subfamily: Chrysauginae
- Genus: Bonchis; Walker, 1862

Synonyms
- Ethnistis Lederer, 1863; Vurna Walker, [1866]; Zarania Walker, [1866]; Gazaca Walker, [1866]

Genus of moths

Bonchis is a genus of snout moths. It was described by Francis Walker in 1862, and is known from Trinidad and Brazil.

== Species ==
- Bonchis glanysis Dyar, 1914 (from Panama)
- Bonchis lichfoldi (Kaye, 1925) (from Trinidad)
- Bonchis munitalis (Lederer, 1863) (North & South America)
- Bonchis scoparioides Walker, 1862 (from Para, Brazil)
