= Bonchis lichfoldi =

Scientific classification
- Domain: Eukaryota
- Kingdom: Animalia
- Phylum: Arthropoda
- Class: Insecta
- Order: Lepidoptera
- Family: Pyralidae
- Genus: Bonchis
- Species: B. lichfoldi

Binomial name
- Bonchis lichfoldi (Kaye, 1925)

Synonyms
- Jocara lichfoldi Kaye, 1925

Species of moth

Bonchis lichfoldi is a species of snout moth in the genus Bonchis. It was described by William James Kaye in 1925, and is known from Trinidad.
