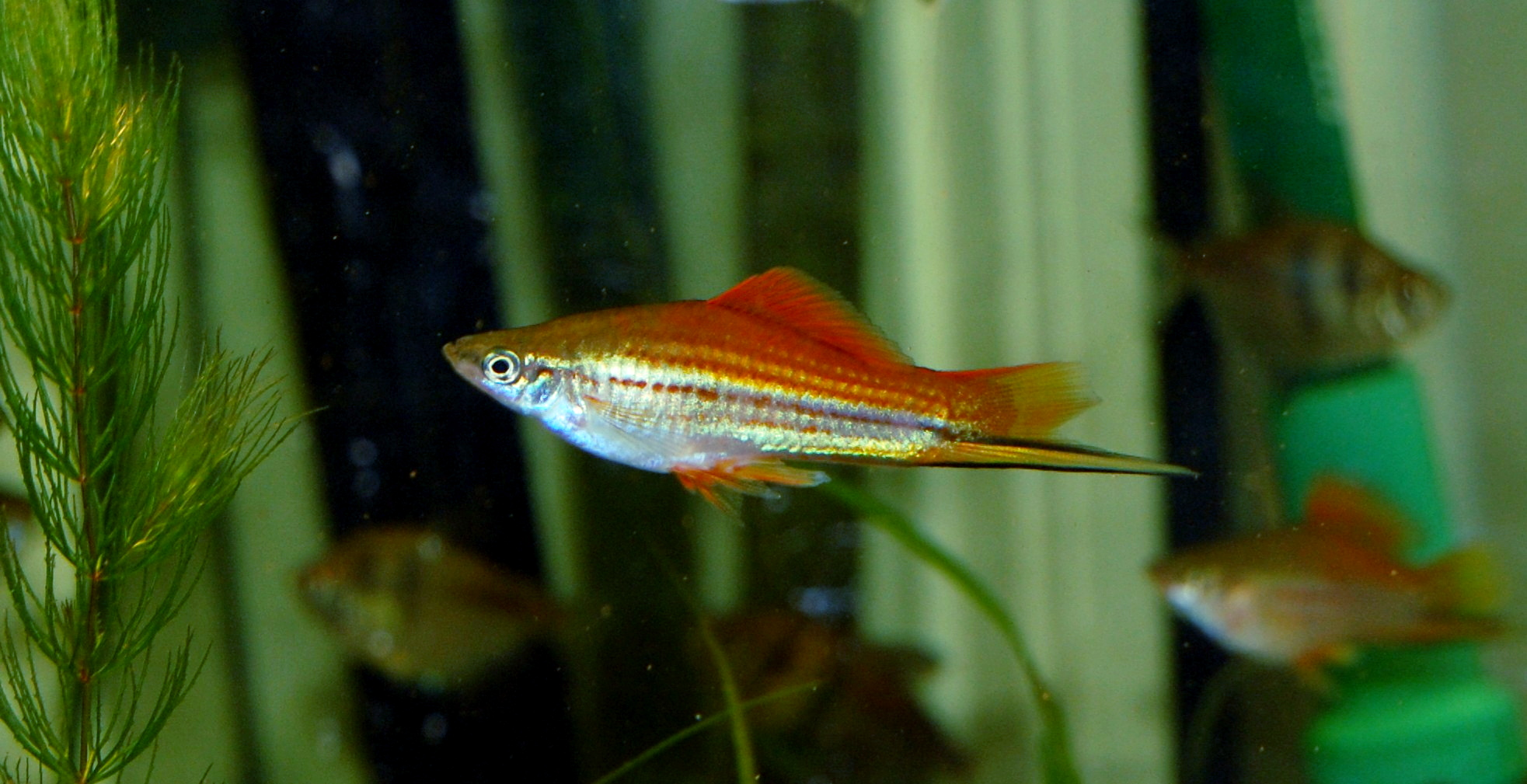
- Wild type male of Xiphophorus hellerii
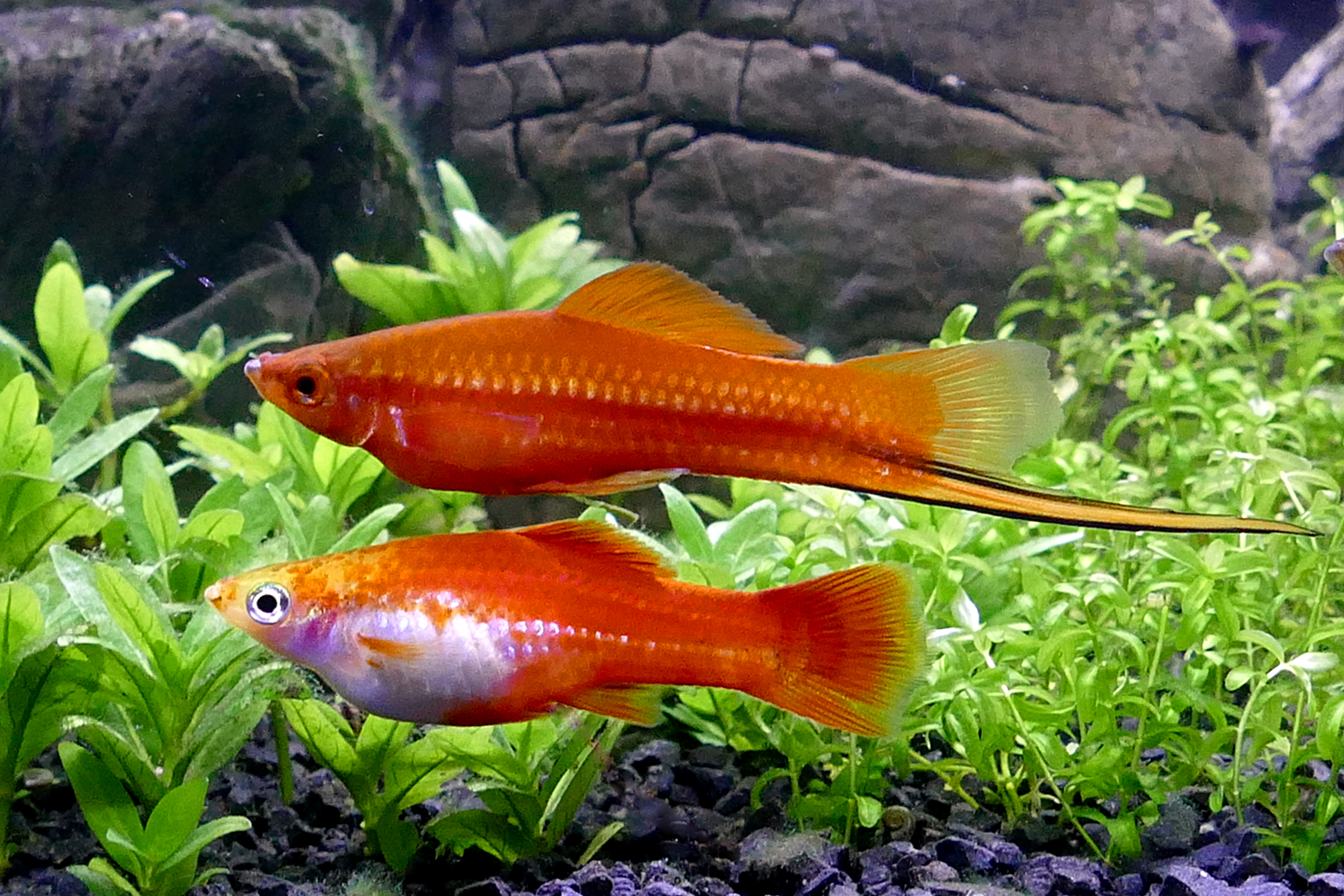
- Xiphophorus hellerii, captive-bred red variant, male (top) and female (below)

Conservation status
- Least Concern (IUCN 3.1)

- Secure (NatureServe)

Scientific classification
- Kingdom: Animalia
- Phylum: Chordata
- Class: Actinopterygii
- Order: Cyprinodontiformes
- Family: Poeciliidae
- Genus: Xiphophorus
- Species: X. hellerii

Binomial name
- Xiphophorus hellerii Heckel, 1848

= Green swordtail =

Species of fish

The green swordtail (Xiphophorus hellerii) is a species of freshwater/brackish fish in family Poeciliidae of order Cyprinodontiformes. A live-bearer, it is closely related to the southern platyfish or 'platy' (X. maculatus) and can crossbreed with it. It is native to an area of North and Central America stretching from Veracruz, Mexico, to northwestern Honduras.

== Description ==
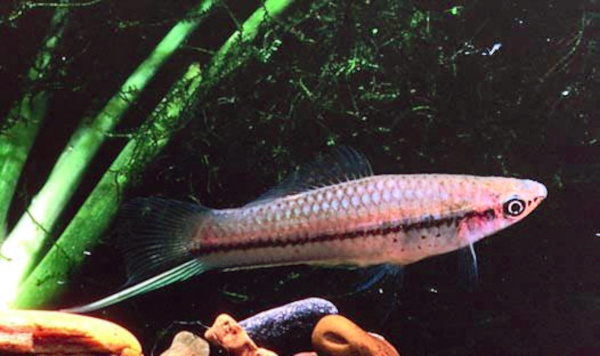
A male swordtail

The male green swordtail grows to a maximum overall length of 14 centimetres (5.5 in) and the female to 16 centimetres (6.3 in). The name 'swordtail' is derived from the elongated lower lobe of the male's caudal fin (tailfin). Sexual dimorphism is moderate, with the female being larger than the male, but lacking the 'sword'. The wild form is olive green in color, with a red or brown lateral stripe and speckles on the dorsal and, sometimes, caudal fins. The male's 'sword' is yellow, edged in black below. Captive breeding has produced many color varieties, including black, red, and many patterns thereof, for the aquarium hobby. All varieties share the dark-red or brown central stripe.

The green swordtail prefers swift-flowing, heavily vegetated rivers and streams, but is also found in warm springs and canals. Omnivorous, its diet includes both plants and small crustaceans, insects, and annelid worms.

== Invasive species ==
X. hellerii has become a nuisance pest as an introduced species in a number of countries. It has caused ecological damage because of its ability to rapidly reproduce in high numbers. Feral populations have established themselves in southern Africa, including Natal and eastern Transvaal in South Africa, Chinhoyi Caves in Zimbabwe, and Otjikoto Lake in Namibia, as well as in Madagascar, Puerto Rico, and Hawaii. Significant populations have also established themselves along the east coast of Australia.

== Etymology and taxonomy ==
The binomial of the green swordtail is made up of its generic name, Xiphophorus which means sword bearer in Greek, a reference to the extended lower part of the caudal fin which is referred to as the "sword". The specific name honours the collector of the type, the Austrian botanist Karl Bartholomaeus Heller (1824–1880), who discovered this fish while exploring México in 1845–1848. The green swordtail was described from Heller's type by Johann Jakob Heckel in 1848 with the type locality given as Orizaba, Mexico. It is the type species of the genus Xiphophorus.

== Aquarium fish ==
One of the most popular tropical aquarium fish, the green swordtail has been bred into various hybrid forms for the aquarium hobby due to its hardiness and suitability for community tanks.

X. hellerii is a common laboratory animal and has been used as a model organism in studies involving female mate preference and male conflict.

It is often designated X. helleri (with one 'i'), but authorities consider this an orthographic error and the spelling with two 'i's to be the valid specific epithet. It is named after Karl Bartholomaeus Heller, who collected the type specimen. Due to interbreeding with the southern platyfish or 'platy', most swordtails in aquariums are hybrids to some degree.

The males' elongated caudal fins have been found to significantly affect their chances at mating. The presence of a well-endowed male spurs the maturity of females, while it inhibits the maturity of juvenile males in the vicinity of the well-endowed male.

== Breeding ==
Swordtails are some of the easiest fish for amateur aquarist to breed, if the conditions of the tank are appropriate and it contains both males and females reproduction will occur without intervention. Often all female groups which have come from a mixed gender tank will be pregnant on arrival, creating a breeding population when the fry sexually mature at around three months of age. Later stages of pregnancy can be seen without much difficulty as a dark gravid spot will develop near the anal fin. Males can be distinguished from females by the presence of a Gonopodium, a modified anal fin used to impregnate the female during breeding. A ratio of one male to three or four females is recommended to ensure that individual females will not be overly harassed to breed.

Plants and other structure in the aquarium will offer fry a place to hide after birth. This is important as newborn fry will be eaten by other aquarium inhabitants if they cannot find shelter.

== Gallery ==
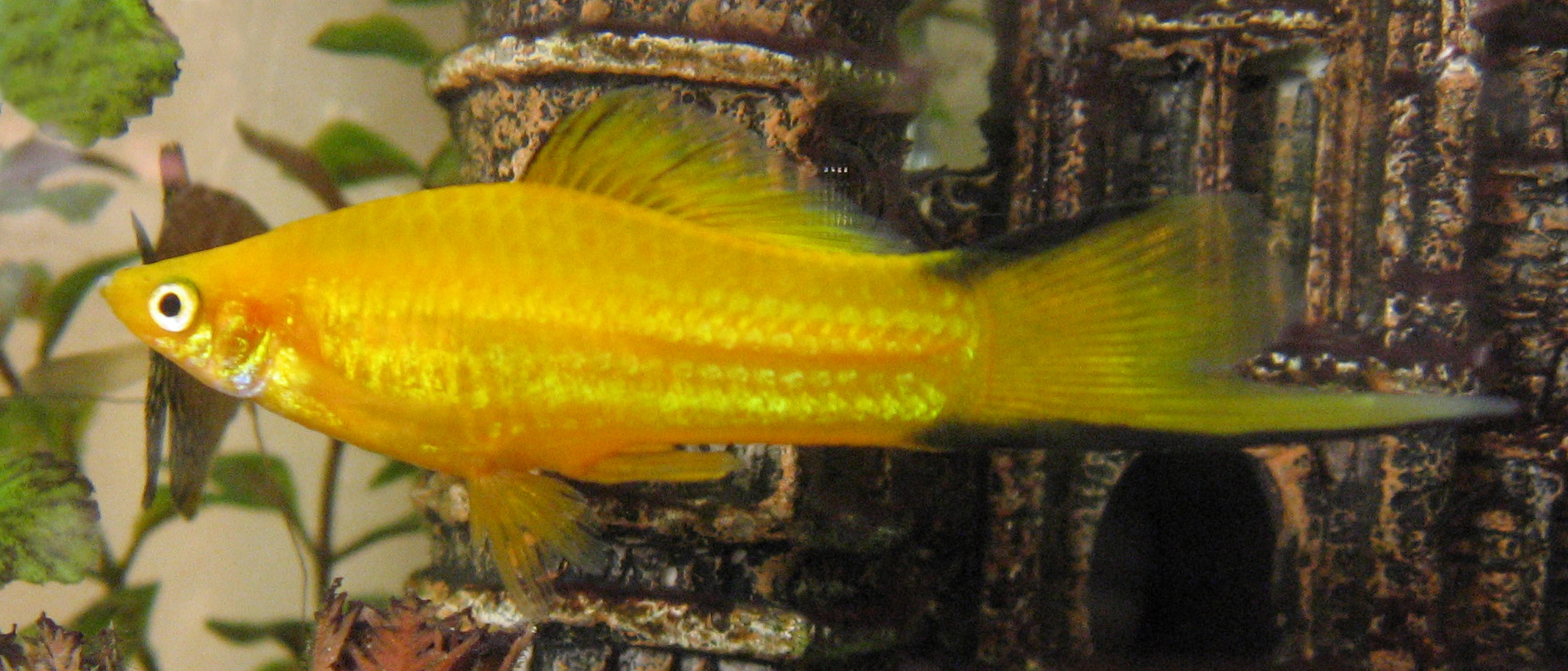
Cultivated form of X. hellerii

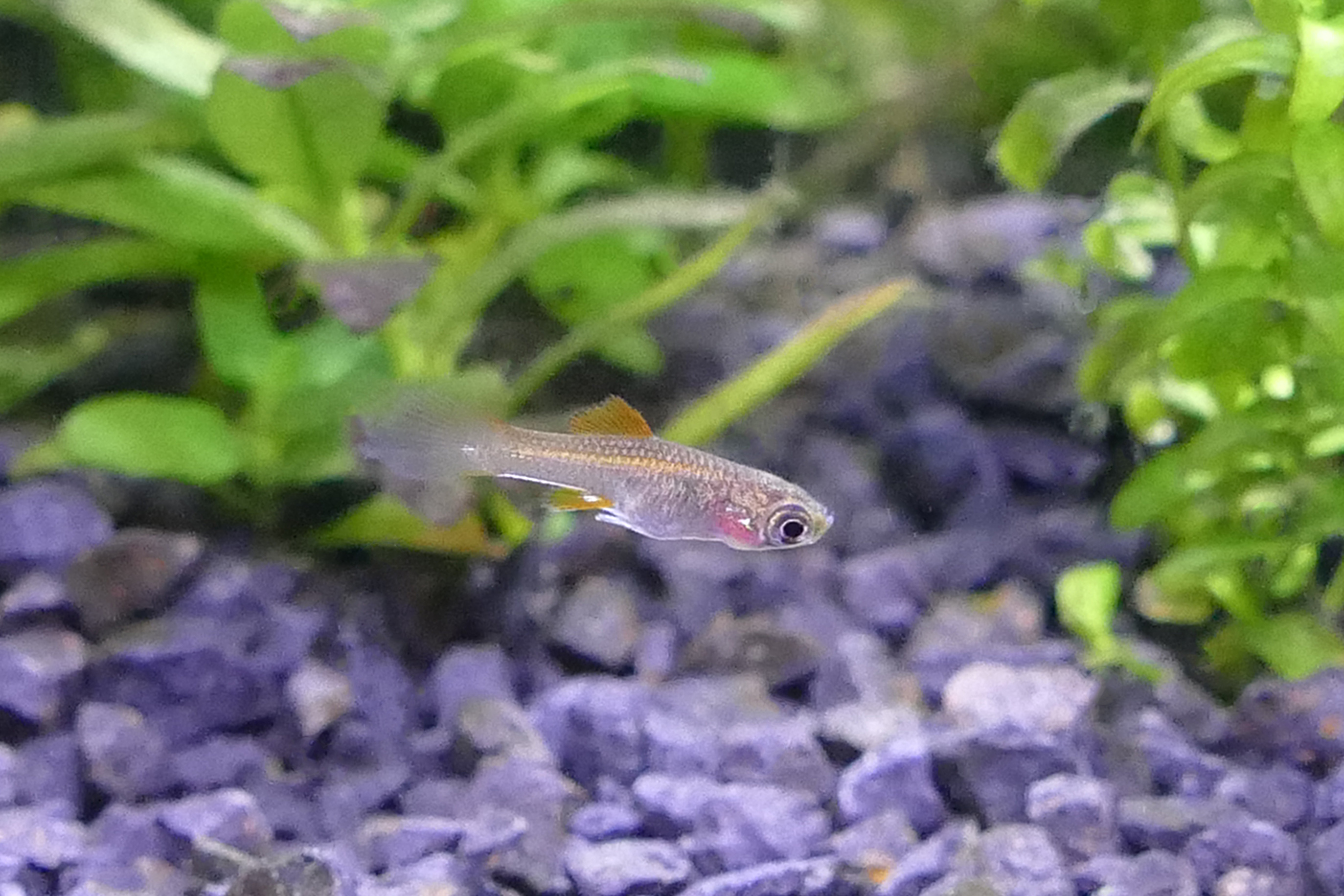
Fry

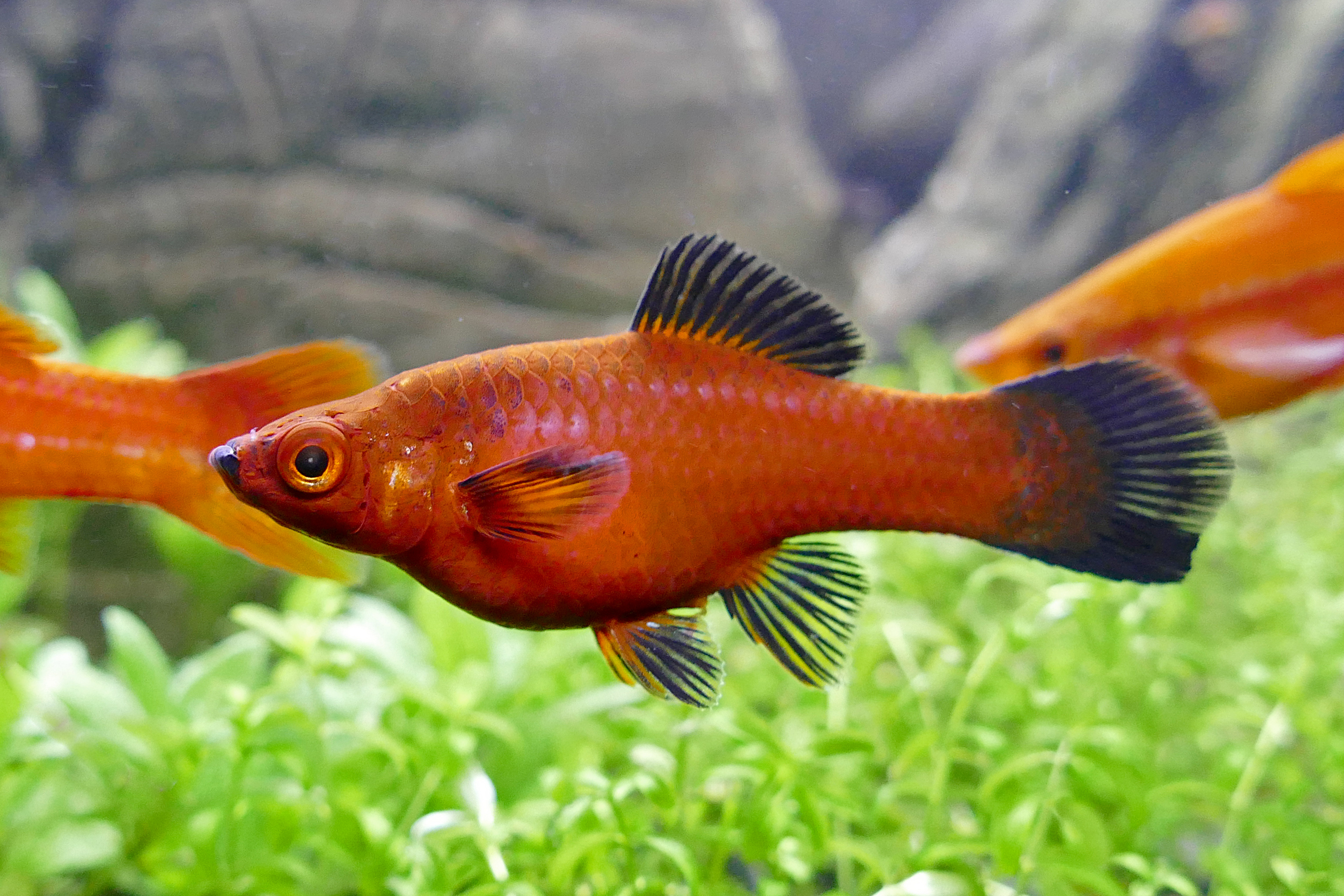

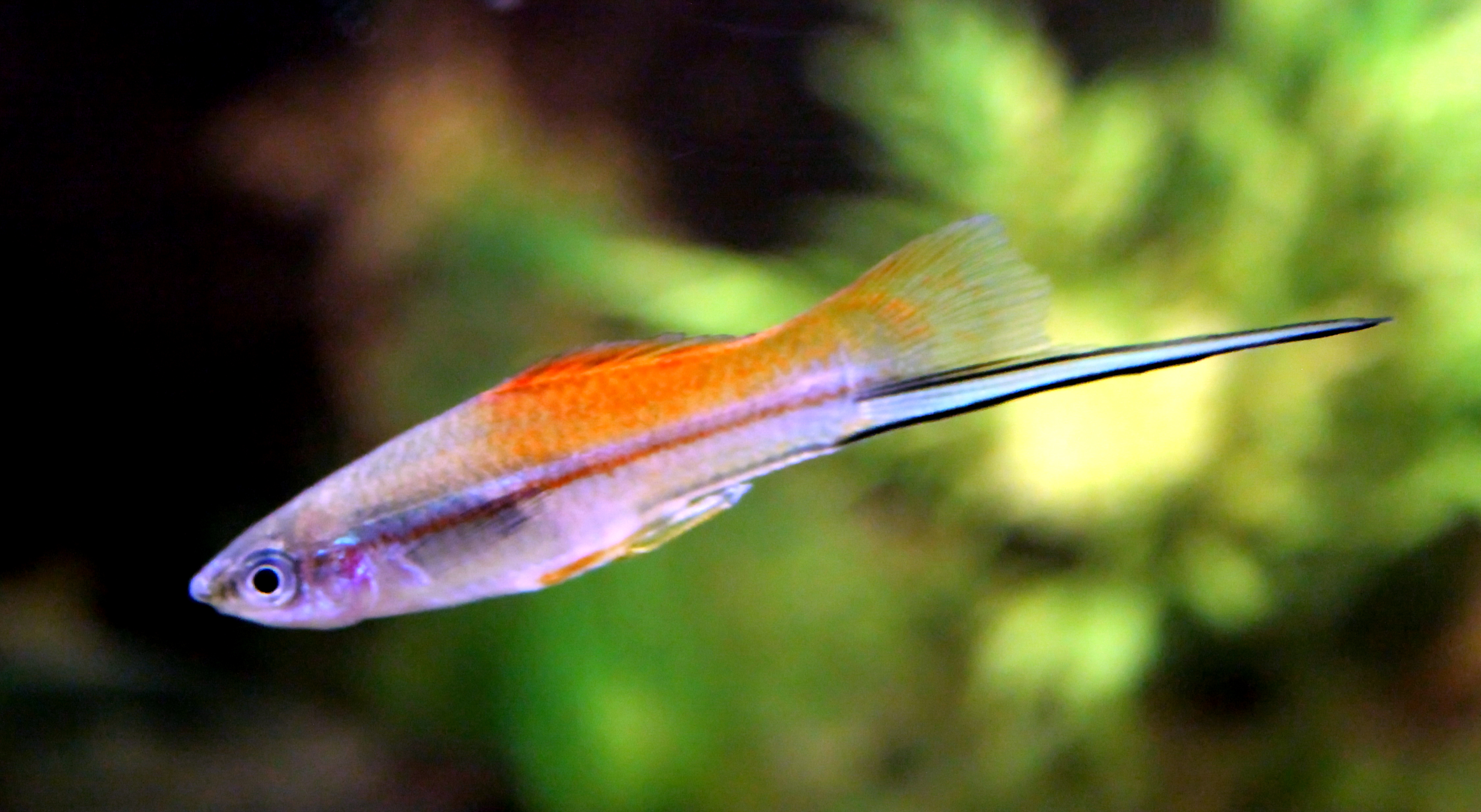
