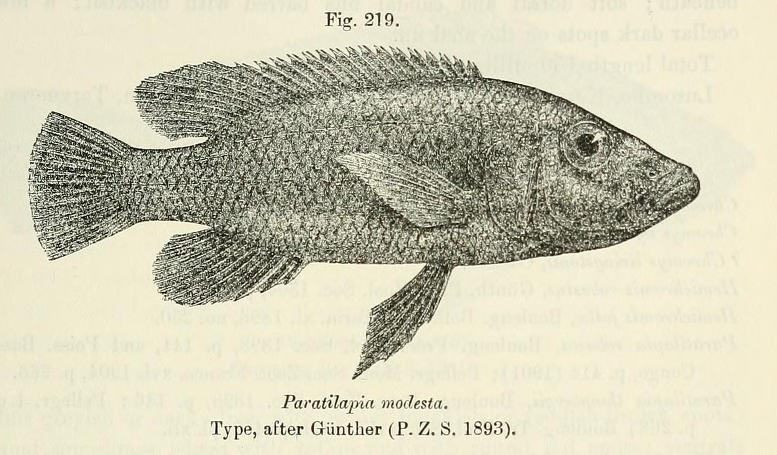

Conservation status
- Least Concern (IUCN 3.1)

Scientific classification
- Kingdom: Animalia
- Phylum: Chordata
- Class: Actinopterygii
- Division: Teleostei
- Order: Cichliformes
- Family: Cichlidae
- Genus: Stigmatochromis
- Species: S. modestus

Binomial name
- Stigmatochromis modestus (Günther, 1894)

Synonyms
- Hemichromis modestus Günther, 1894; Cyrtocara modesta (Günther, 1894); Haplochromis modestus (Günther, 1894); Paratilapia modesta (Günther, 1894)

= Stigmatochromis modestus =

Species of fish

Stigmatochromis modestus is a species of cichlid endemic to Lake Malawi where it lives among rocks. It is an ambush predator, feeding on other fish. It can reach a length of 25 centimetres (9.8 in) TL. It can also be found in the aquarium trade.
