= Candel =

Candel may be:

- a surname related to Kandel
  - Sébastien Candel (born 1946), French physicist
  - Francesc Candel Tortajada (1925–2007), writer and journalist
  - Vicente Carlos Campillo Candel (born 1951), Spanish footballer and manager
- a Middle English spelling of candle
- Candel Astra, or simply candel, an Uruguayan brand of candy

== See also ==
- Candle (disambiguation)
- Kandel (disambiguation)
- CANDELS
