= Anabasis prompta =

Scientific classification
- Kingdom: Animalia
- Phylum: Arthropoda
- Clade: Pancrustacea
- Class: Insecta
- Order: Lepidoptera
- Family: Pyralidae
- Genus: Anabasis
- Species: A. prompta

Binomial name
- Anabasis prompta Y.L. Du, S.M. Song & C.S. Wu, 2009

Species of moth

Anabasis prompta is a species of snout moth. It was described by Y.L. Du, S.M. Song and C.S. Wu in 2009. It is found in China (Guangxi).
