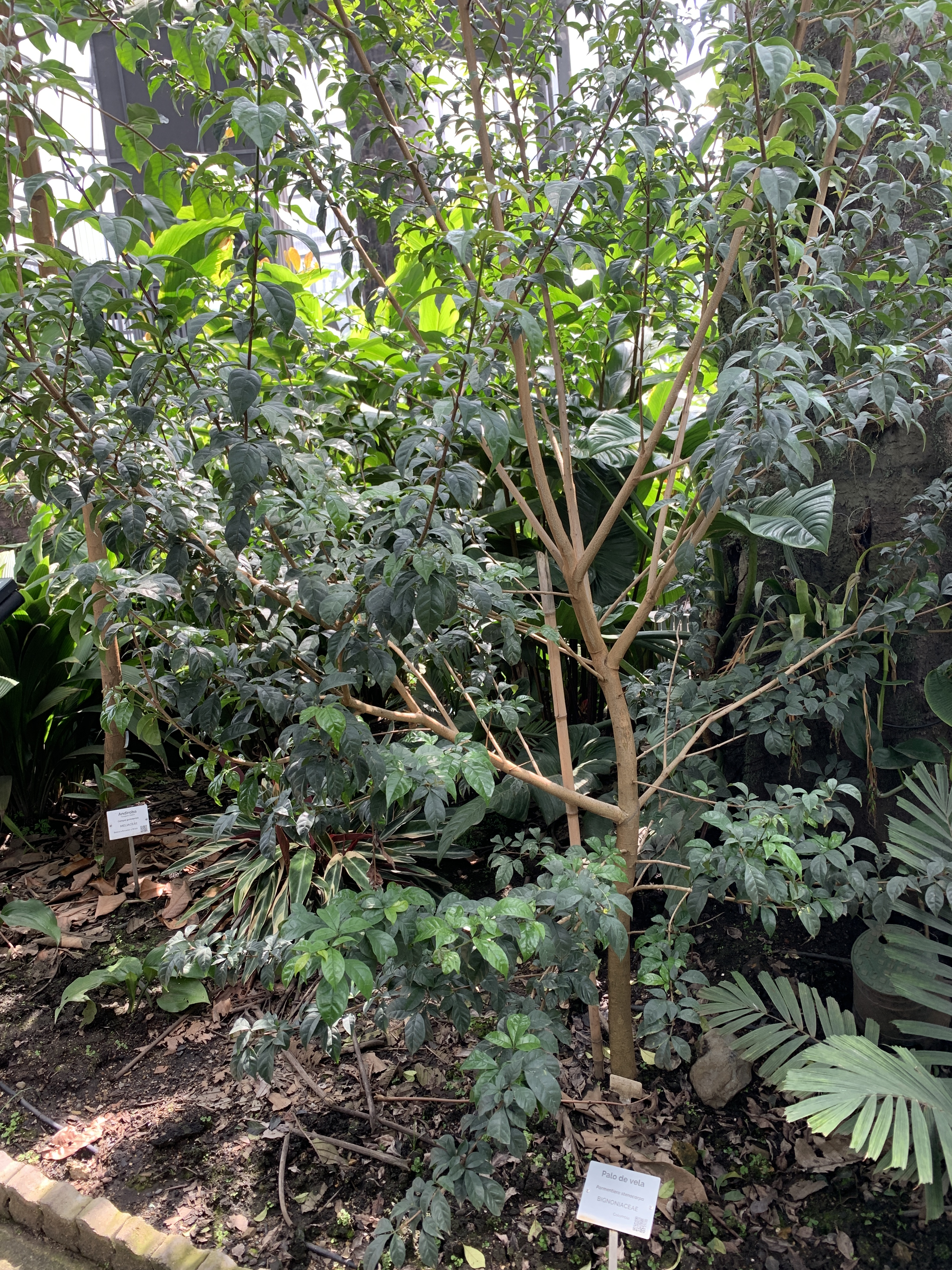

Conservation status
- Least Concern (IUCN 3.1)

Scientific classification
- Kingdom: Plantae
- Clade: Tracheophytes
- Clade: Angiosperms
- Clade: Eudicots
- Clade: Asterids
- Order: Lamiales
- Family: Bignoniaceae
- Genus: Parmentiera
- Species: P. stenocarpa

Binomial name
- Parmentiera stenocarpa Dugand & L.B.Smith

= Parmentiera stenocarpa =

Species of flowering plant

Parmentiera stenocarpa is a species of plant in the family Bignoniaceae. It is endemic to Colombia.
