= Candle tree =

Candle tree is a common name for several plants and may refer to:

- Dacryodes excelsa
- Parmentiera cereifera of the family Bignoniaceae
- Senna alata of the family Fabaceae (Candelabra bush, empress candle plant, candlestick tree, ringworm tree)
