= Parmentiera morii =

Conservation status
- Critically Endangered (IUCN 2.3)

Scientific classification
- Kingdom: Plantae
- Clade: Tracheophytes
- Clade: Angiosperms
- Clade: Eudicots
- Clade: Asterids
- Order: Lamiales
- Family: Bignoniaceae
- Genus: Parmentiera
- Species: P. morii

Binomial name
- Parmentiera morii A.Gentry

Species of flowering plant

Parmentiera morii is a plant species in the family Bignoniaceae. It is endemic to Panama. It is threatened by habitat loss.
