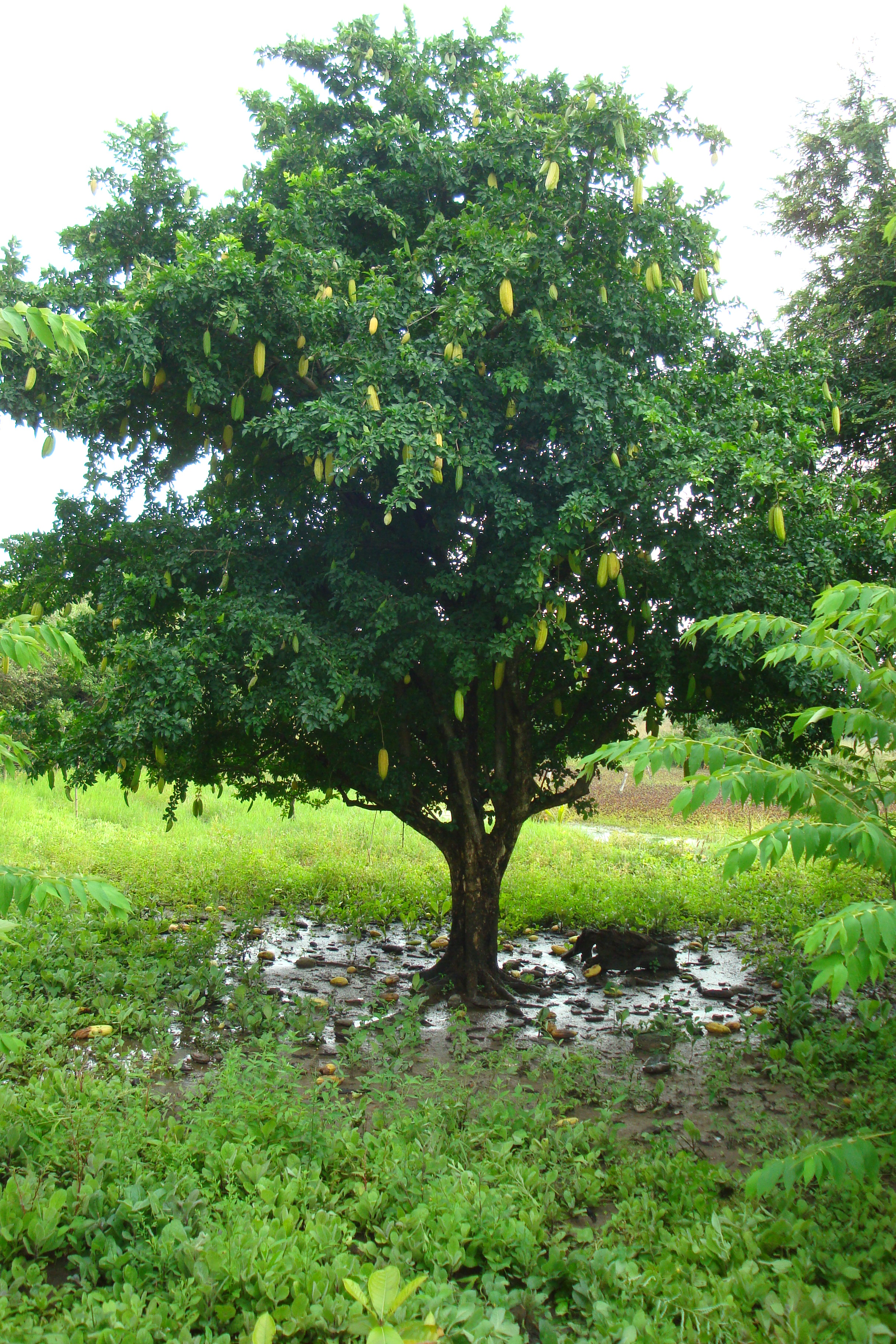
- Fruit-bearing Parmentiera aculeata tree

Conservation status
- Least Concern (IUCN 3.1)

Scientific classification
- Kingdom: Plantae
- Clade: Tracheophytes
- Clade: Angiosperms
- Clade: Eudicots
- Clade: Asterids
- Order: Lamiales
- Family: Bignoniaceae
- Genus: Parmentiera
- Species: P. aculeata

Binomial name
- Parmentiera aculeata (Kunth) Seem. ([1819] 1854)

Synonyms
- List: Crescentia aculeata Kunth; Crescentia edulis Desv.; Crescentia edulis Moc. ex DC.; Crescentia edulis Sessé ex Moc.; Crescentia musaecarpa Zaldivar; Crescentia musaecarpa Zaldivar ex C.Heller; Crescentia musaecarpa Zaldivar ex F.Heller; Crescentia musicarpa Zaldivar; Crescentia musicarpa Zaldivar ex C.Heller; Parmentiera aculeata (Kunth) L.O.Williams; Parmentiera adulis; Parmentiera edulis DC.; Parmentiera foliolosa Miers; Parmentiera lanceolata Miers

= Parmentiera aculeata =

Species of plant

Parmentiera aculeata (synonym Parmentiera edulis), commonly known as cow okra, cuajilote, guajilote, huachilote, or pepino kat, is a species of flowering tree in the family Bignoniaceae. It is native to Mexico and Central America and is known primarily for its edible fruit and medicinal properties.

== Etymology ==
The specific epithet (aculeata) is derived from Latin aculeatus, which means "stinger", and refers to the thorns that are present on the nodes of young branches. The genus Parmentiera is named after French pharmacist and agronomist Antoine-Augustin Parmentier.

== Distribution ==
Parmentiera aculeata is native to central Mexico south to Nicaragua. It has been introduced to southern Central America, northern South America, and the Caribbean, and is also cultivated in the United States, East Africa, Maritime Southeast Asia, and Australia. It has become an invasive species in northern Queensland.

It usually grows in dry to moist thickets and lowland forests, often near waterbodies, typically at elevations around 1,200 meters (3,900 feet), and prefers well-drained, sunny areas with medium to high rainfall. It is hardy to USDA zones 10–12 and is not frost tolerant.

== Description ==
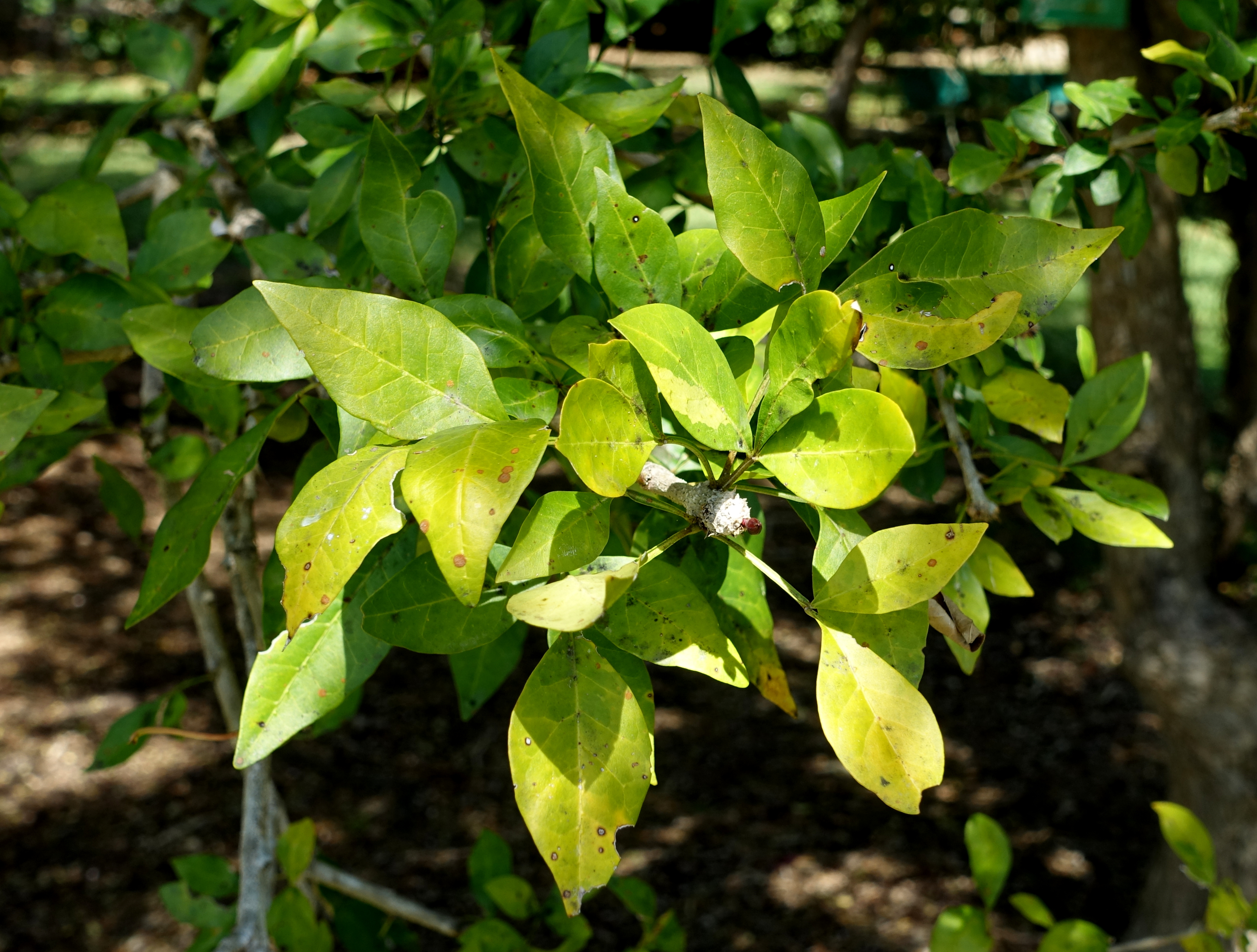
Foliage

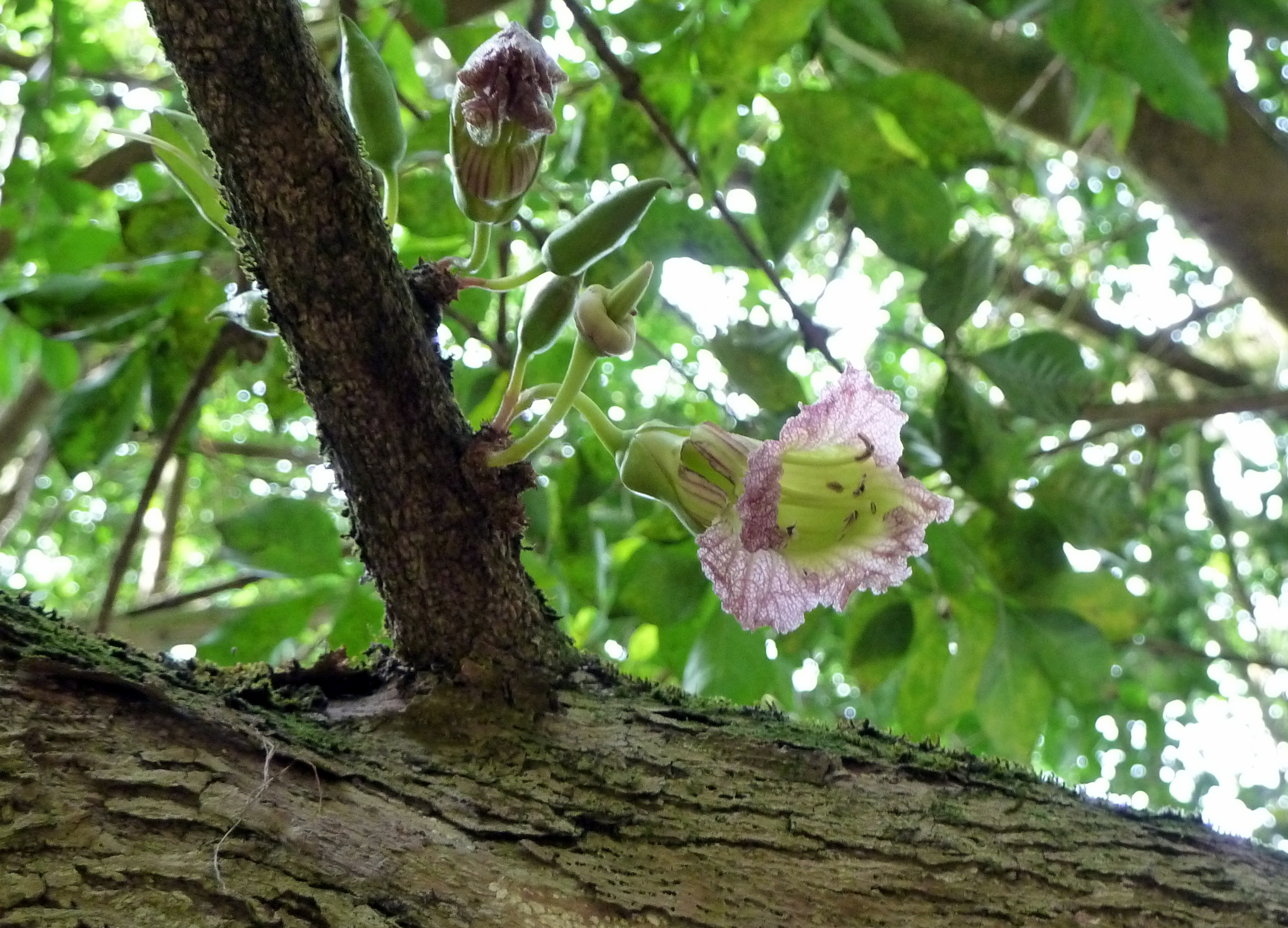
Flowers at various stages

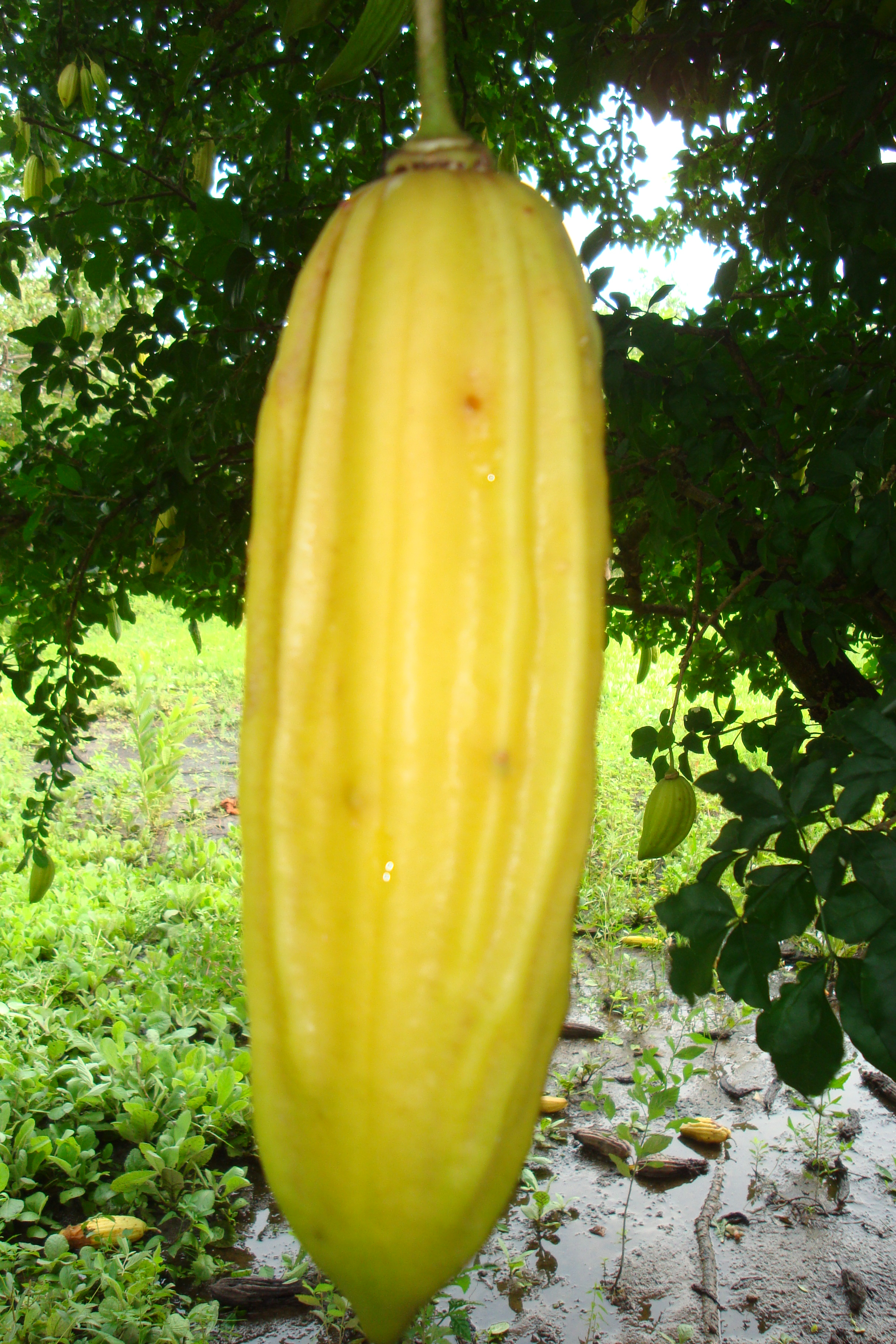
Fruit

P. aculeata is a small to medium-sized tree, typically growing to heights of around 10 meters (33 feet). It is evergreen to semi-deciduous. The trunk is erect and typically measures around 30 centimeters (12 inches) in diameter. The bark is light brown to gray in color and is slightly fissured. The young branches are terete and glabrous to slightly puberulous, and the nodes contain a thick thorn that subtends each leaf. The leaves are opposite to subopposite, sometimes alternate, and are typically 3-foliate but may occasionally be 4-foliate. The petioles measure 1.3–3.5 centimeters (0.51–1.38 inches) in length, are narrowly winged, and have a strong groove on top. The leaflets are entire and elliptic to obovate in shape, while the margins may be acute or obtuse, and the bases are cuneate to attenuate. Terminal leaflets are 1.5–6 centimeters (0.59–2.36 inches) in length and 0.6–3 centimeters (0.24–1.18 inches) in width while lateral leaflets are 1.5–5 centimeters (0.59–1.97 inches) in length and 0.6–2.5 centimeters (0.24–0.98 inches) in width. The petiolules measure up to 1 centimeter (0.39 inches) in length.

The inflorescences consist of few-flowered fascicles or single flowers, and are terminal or axillary near the branch tips, though may be borne of the nodes in older branches. The flowers are tubular, typically contain 5 sepals, 4 or 5 petals, and 5 anthers, and may be green, white, or purple in color. They are acute to short acuminate in their budding stage and measure 2.5–4 centimeters (0.98–1.57 inches) in length. The calyces are spathaceous. The corollas are campanulate, 5–7 centimeters (2.0–2.8 inches) in length, and 2–2.5 centimeters (0.79–0.98 inches) in width. The stamens are subexserted. The anther thecae are weakly divergent, thick, and measure 5–6 millimeters (0.20–0.24 inches) in length. The ovary is oblong to linear and lepidote, while the ovules are multiseriate.

The fruit is a large, fleshy, fibrous berry of yellow-green color, and grows directly from the trunk and branches of the tree. It is somewhat cylindrical in shape, thickly ribbed, tapered, and slightly curved. It measures 8–18 centimeters (3.1–7.1 inches) in length and 3–5 centimeters (1.2–2.0 inches) in diameter, and contains numerous flat, somewhat round seeds that measure approximately 3 millimeters (0.12 inches) in diameter.

P. aculeata seeds typically germinate within 1–5 weeks of planting. The tree begins flowering around 3–5 years of age.

== Chemistry ==
The pulp of the ripe fruit contains phenolic compounds and exhibits antioxidant and antibacterial effects. The juice of the fruit was found to encourage Lactobacillus growth.

An extract from the fruit was found to induce diuretic and antiurolithiatic effects in Wistar rats.

Hexane extract from the fruit was found to induce cytotoxic and apoptotic effects against breast cancer cell line MDA-MB231. MTT assays conducted three days after treatment showed an IC_{50} value of 94.63 + 1.63 μg/ml.

A guaianolide, lactucin-8-0-methylacrylate, was isolated from the dried fruits of P. aculeata in 2000. After being administered via intraperitoneal injection to diabetic mice in amounts of 300 mg/kg, blood glucose levels decreased by 43.75%, and by 29.61% in non-diabetic mice.

P. aculeata fruits contain high amounts of lignocellulosic content. Unripe fruits contain cellulose content of 42.17% and lignin content of 35.26%, while ripe fruits contain cellulose content of 32.76% and lignin content of 40.79%.

== Uses ==
P. aculeata is planted as an ornamental, shade tree and live fence throughout its native range. Its fruits are edible and are eaten either raw or cooked, and are sometimes pickled or made into preserves. Its flavor is reportedly similar to sugarcane. They are also used as cattle fodder in southern Mexico.

The plant is commonly used in traditional medicine. The fruit is used to treat common colds, diabetes, asthma, headaches, diarrhea, and gallstones, while the roots are used as a diuretic.
