= Anabasis medogia =

Scientific classification
- Kingdom: Animalia
- Phylum: Arthropoda
- Clade: Pancrustacea
- Class: Insecta
- Order: Lepidoptera
- Family: Pyralidae
- Genus: Anabasis
- Species: A. medogia

Binomial name
- Anabasis medogia H.H. Li & Y.D. Ren, 2010

Species of moth

Anabasis medogia is a species of snout moth. It was described by Hou-Hun Li and Ying-Dang Ren in 2010. It is found in Tibet, China.
