= Parmentiera dressleri =

Conservation status
- Endangered (IUCN 3.1)

Scientific classification
- Kingdom: Plantae
- Clade: Tracheophytes
- Clade: Angiosperms
- Clade: Eudicots
- Clade: Asterids
- Order: Lamiales
- Family: Bignoniaceae
- Genus: Parmentiera
- Species: P. dressleri

Binomial name
- Parmentiera dressleri A.H.Gentry

Species of flowering plant

Parmentiera dressleri is a species of flowering plant in the family of Bignoniaceae. It is a tree native to Costa Rica and Panama. It is threatened by habitat loss.
