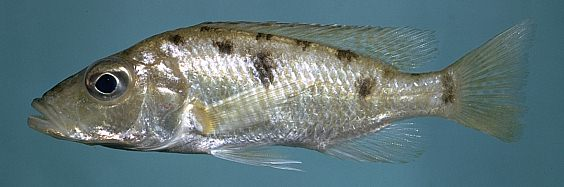

Conservation status
- Least Concern (IUCN 3.1)

Scientific classification
- Kingdom: Animalia
- Phylum: Chordata
- Class: Actinopterygii
- Order: Cichliformes
- Family: Cichlidae
- Genus: Stigmatochromis
- Species: S. woodi

Binomial name
- Stigmatochromis woodi (Regan, 1922)

Synonyms
- Haplochromis woodi Regan, 1922; Cyrtocara woodi (Regan, 1922)

= Stigmatochromis woodi =

Species of fish

Stigmatochromis woodi is a species of cichlid endemic to Lake Malawi where it can be found hunting for prey over sandy areas. It can reach a length of 25 centimetres (9.8 in) TL. It can also be found in the aquarium trade. The specific name honours Rodney C. Wood, whose collection of cichlids from Lake Malawi, which included the type of this species, was presented to the British Museum (Natural History). It is the type species of the genus Stigmatochromis.
