= Candle hap =

Conservation status
- Least Concern (IUCN 3.1)

Scientific classification
- Kingdom: Animalia
- Phylum: Chordata
- Class: Actinopterygii
- Order: Cichliformes
- Family: Cichlidae
- Genus: Stigmatochromis
- Species: S. pholidophorus

Binomial name
- Stigmatochromis pholidophorus (Trewavas, 1935)

Synonyms
- Haplochromis pholidophorus Trewavas, 1935; Cyrtocara pholidophorus (Trewavas, 1935)

Species of fish

The candle hap (Stigmatochromis pholidophorus) is a species of cichlid endemic to Lake Malawi where it can be found hunting for prey over sandy areas. It can reach a length of 10.8|cm. TL. It can also be found in the aquarium trade.
