= Richard Fish Cadle =

American Episcopal priest

Richard Fish Cadle (April 17, 1796 – November 9, 1857) was an American Episcopal priest and the first superior of Nashotah House.

== Biography ==
Born in New York City, New York, Cadle received his bachelor's and master's degree from Columbia University and was influenced by Bishop John Henry Hobart. In 1820 he was ordained a priest. He served as rector of a parish in New Jersey 1820–1823. In 1824, Cadle was sent to Detroit, Michigan Territory where he started St. Paul the Apostle Church. In 1829, he was named superintendent of the Indian mission school (Cadle Mission) in Green Bay, Michigan Territory. He resigned in 1843 and was a missionary in Wisconsin Territory serving in Prairie du Chien, Mineral Point, Whitewater, and Green Bay. He also served as chaplain at Fort Crawford. In 1841, Bishop Jackson Kemper named Cadle superior of the fellowship which resulted in the Nashotah mission and Nashotah House; he felt unsuited as superior of Nashtotah House and resumed his missionary work. Cadle served as chaplain of the Wisconsin Territorial Legislature 1843–1844. In 1844, he retired from being a missionary and served churches in New York, Vermont, and Delaware. He died in Seaford, Delaware.
