= Candlelight =

Candlelight or Candlelighting or Candlelighter may refer to:

- Light created by a candle
- Candlelighting, the lighting of Shabbat candles
- A candlelight vigil, an outdoor assembly of people carrying candles, held after sunset in order to show support for a specific cause
- Candlelighter (person), or candle-lighter (κανδηλάπτης, kandilaptis) Semantron, Acolyte
- Candlelighter (device), or candle lighter
- "The Candle Lighter", List of works by Frederik Pohl 1955
- Candlelighters or Candlelighters Childhood Cancer Foundation, American Childhood Cancer Organization, a charitable organization

== Music ==
- Candlelight Records, a British extreme metal record label owned by Universal Music Group
- "Candlelight" (Csézy song)
- "Candlelight" (Six by Seven song)
- "Candlelight", a song by Janis Ian on the album Miracle Row
- "Candlelight", a song by Labelle on the album Back to Now
- "Candlelight" (The Maccabeats song), 2010
- "Candlelight", a song by Relient K on the album Forget and Not Slow Down
- "Candlelights" (song), Bix Beiderbecke tune
- Soft, slow and almost fully acoustic edits or remixes of certain types of Dance songs. E.g. "DJ Sammy & Yanou ft. Do - Heaven (Candlelight Mix)"
