= Cadley, Georgia =

Cadley
- Unincorporated community
- Location within the state of Georgia Cadley (the United States)
- Coordinates: 33°32′01″N 82°39′34″W
- Country: United States
- State: Georgia
- County: Warren
- Elevation: 554 ft (169 m)
- Time zone: UTC-5 (Eastern (EST))
  - Summer (DST): UTC-4 (EDT)
- Area code: 706
- GNIS ID: 331304

Cadley is an unincorporated community in Warren County, Georgia, United States.
