= Candleman =

2017 video game

- Developer: Spotlightor Interactive
- Publishers: Zodiac Interactive; Indienova; E-Home Entertainment
- Platforms: Xbox One; Windows; macOS; iOS; Android; PlayStation 4; Nintendo Switch
- Release: Xbox One; February 1, 2017; Windows; January 31, 2018 macOS; February 9, 2018 iOS, Android; March 27, 2018; PlayStation 4 August 21, 2018; Nintendo Switch; October 3, 2019
- Genre: Puzzle-platform
- Mode: Single-player

Candleman is a 3D puzzle-platform game developed by Chinese studio Spotlightor Interactive and published by Indienova and Zodiac Interactive. It was created as a prototype for a Ludum Dare game jam. Following positive reception, a full version of the game was released for the Xbox One and was published on February 1, 2017. It was updated later the same year to Candleman: The Complete Journey with a downloadable Lost Light add-on. The game received positive reviews for its graphics, concept, music, and story, with complaints coming from a lack of depth in the story and difficulty.

== Gameplay ==
Candleman is a platformer with run and jump mechanics, but the light is mostly muted to nearly total darkness. The main character, named "the little candle" in cutscenes, serves as a light source to properly see through the darkness. However, the candle can only be used for a total time of 10 seconds per level, and if the player goes over this time, it results in a game over. Other light sources can come from the ambience and level design. The goal is to get to the end of each level, and light specific candles along the way.

The base game has a number of individual levels over a course of 13 chapters, and the DLC comes with an additional 3, with additional storytelling cutscenes. After completing the base game, a time trial mode is unlocked, which doesn't require having to light up individual candles.

The story starts on an abandoned ship, where an anthropomorphic candle questions his life purpose and where he is. After spotting a lighthouse, he sets on a journey of inspiration. The ending of the main game is unclear.

== Development ==
In 2013, Candleman was originally created as a prototype for a 48-hour Ludum Dare game jam under the theme of "ten seconds". After receiving widespread recognition, the initial prototype was showcased by Kongregate and received positive reception, and was eventually put on the front page. The developer purchased publishing rights for the Xbox One six months later. The original game was released worldwide on February 1, 2017, and later added three additional chapters on October 20, titled Lost Light, and was then released to consoles. During development, local co-op was considered, but focus was shifted due to a lack of development time. Candleman was released for Windows on January 31, 2018, and for macOS on February 9, 2018. A mobile version was released for iOS and Android on March 27, 2018. Versions for PlayStation 4 and Nintendo Switch were released on August 21, 2018, and October 3, 2019, respectively.

== Reception ==
Reception

Aggregate score
Aggregator	Score
Metacritic	NS: 75/100 (Note: Based on 7 reviews.); PC: 76/100 (Note: Based on 13 reviews.); PS4: 76/100 (Note: Based on 5 reviews.); XONE: 78/100 (Note: Based on 13 reviews.)

Review scores
Publication	Score
Destructoid	7/10
Hardcore Gamer	4.5/5
Nintendo Life	7/10
Pocket Gamer	4/5

Candleman received generally favorable reviews, from review aggregator Metacritic. After publishing, players had an issue with the gameplay being too short and easy; Mark Jansen from Tech Raptor claimed that the difficulty fluctuates, but never reached full potential. Although the game was designed with the intention of appealing to a larger audience, the creator responded to criticisms about its low difficulty by adding a competitive leaderboard.

Critics praise the game for its unique graphics and visuals. Ollie Reynolds from Nintendo Life stated how the game was "beautiful to behold", with abstract scenery and vibrant lighting. Jake Arias from Killapenguin.com called the visuals "screenshot bait", with colorful scenery and lighting, with early stages having "so-so" textures.

Complaints from the game mainly revolved around the loss of depth in the game's plot.
