= Brian Cadle =

Canadian ice hockey player

- Born: September 18, 1948 North Vancouver, British Columbia, Canada
- Died: November 6, 2015 (aged 67) Calgary, AB, CAN
- Height: 6 ft 1 in (185 cm)
- Weight: 170 lb (77 kg; 12 st 2 lb)
- Position: Left wing
- Shot: Left
- Played for: Winnipeg Jets
- Playing career: 1967–1974

Brian Cadle (September 13, 1948 – November 6, 2015) was a professional ice hockey player who played 56 games as a left winger in the World Hockey Association with the Winnipeg Jets, during their inaugural 1972–73 season. He died of brain cancer in 2015.

== Career statistics ==
=== Regular season and playoffs ===
			Regular season					Playoffs
Season	Team	League	GP	G	A	Pts	PIM	GP	G	A	Pts	PIM
1966–67	Winnipeg Rangers	MJHL	Statistics Unavailable
1967–68	Winnipeg Jets	WCJHL	40	7	16	23	78	––	––	––	––	––
1968–69	Winnipeg Jets	WCHL	43	15	19	34	94	––	––	––	––	––
1969–70	Winnipeg Jets	WCHL	57	17	22	39	195	––	––	––	––	––
1970–71	Providence Reds	AHL	9	1	1	2	11	––	––	––	––	––
1970–71	Des Moines Oak Leafs	IHL	23	1	5	6	25	11	3	4	7	28
1971–72	Des Moines Oak Leafs	IHL	31	4	10	14	103	––	––	––	––	––
1971–72	Columbus Golden Seals	IHL	3	0	1	1	2	––	––	––	––	––
1972–73	Winnipeg Jets	WHA	56	4	4	8	39	3	0	0	0	0
1973–74	Greensboro Generals	SHL	12	0	2	2	14	6	0	2	2	6
WHA totals			56	4	4	8	39	3	0	0	0	0
