= Candler Building =

Candler Building may refer to several United States buildings named for Asa Griggs Candler (1851–1929) of Atlanta, who purchased the recipe for Coca-Cola from its creator, founded the Coca-Cola Company and developed a huge international business; these include:

- Candler Building (Atlanta)
- Candler Building (New York City)
- Candler Building (Baltimore), Inner Harbor of Baltimore, Maryland
- Western Auto Building, Kansas City, first known as the Coca-Cola Building or the Candler Building
