= Karl Bartholomaeus Heller =

Austrian botanist and naturalist

Karl Bartholomaeus Heller (also spelled Carl Bartholomäus Heller; 20 November 1824 – 14 December 1880) was an Austrian botanist and naturalist. He explored Mexico in 1845–1848 and published his memoir. In the latter year Johann Jakob Heckel published the livebearing freshwater Green swordtail (Xiphophorus helleri), since the early 20th century a common aquarium fish, from specimens Heller deposited in Vienna. Born in Moravia, Heller was a professor at the Theresianum in Vienna. Among Heller's later works is his defense of Darwinism, Darwin und der Darwinismus, 1869.
