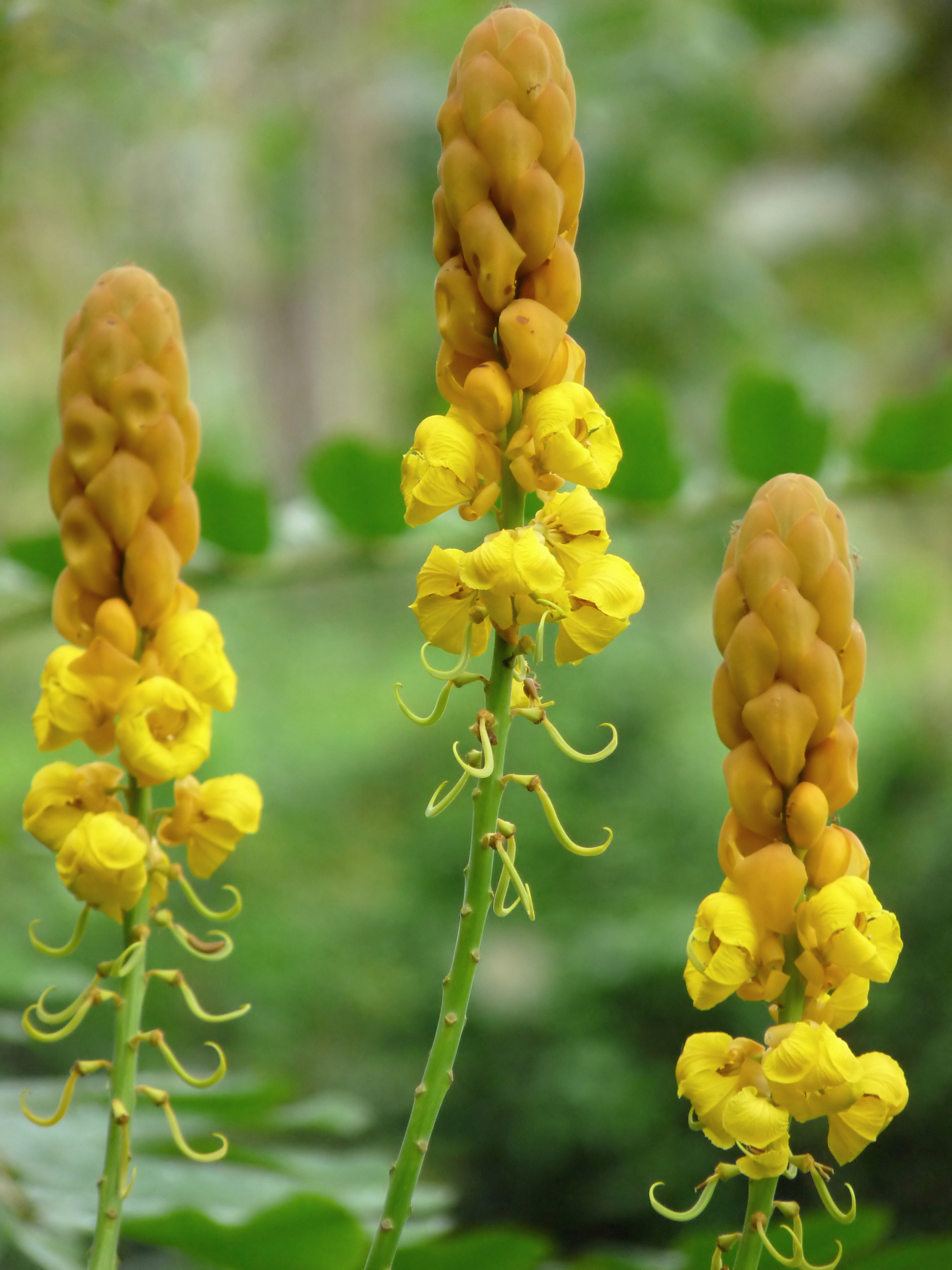

Conservation status
- Least Concern (IUCN 3.1)

Scientific classification
- Kingdom: Plantae
- Clade: Tracheophytes
- Clade: Angiosperms
- Clade: Eudicots
- Clade: Rosids
- Order: Fabales
- Family: Fabaceae
- Subfamily: Caesalpinioideae
- Genus: Senna
- Species: S. alata

Binomial name
- Senna alata (L.) Roxb.

Synonyms
- Cassia alata L.; Cassia alata L. var. perennis Pamp.; Cassia alata L. var. rumphiana DC.; Cassia bracteata L.f.; Cassia herpetica Jacq.; Cassia rumphiana (DC.) Bojer; Herpetica alata (L.) Raf.

= Senna alata =

Species of legume

Senna alata is an important Neotropical medicinal tree, as well as an ornamental flowering plant in the subfamily Caesalpinioideae. It also known as emperor's candlesticks, candle bush, candelabra bush, Christmas candles, empress candle plant, ringworm shrub, Roman candle, or candletree. A remarkable species of Senna, it was sometimes separated in its own genus, Herpetica.

== Geographic range ==
Senna alata is native to most of the Neotropics (from Mexico and the West Indies to Paraguay), and can be found in diverse habitats. In the tropics, it grows up to an altitude of 1,200 metres (3,900 ft). It was first brought over to the Old World by the Spanish galleon trade with Manila in the 16th century, and it is still known as akapulko (after Acapulco) in the Philippines. They have since spread to other parts of the Old World tropics. They are valued for both their ornamental and medicinal applications.

It is so naturalized in the Malay Peninsula (known in Malay: gelenggang) that its blooming from mid November-December there has become incorporated in the Kedahan traditional rice planting cycle (piama) as a marker of its beginning dry season.

== Description ==
The shrub stands 3–4 metres (9.8–13.1 ft) tall, with leaves 50–80 centimetres (20–31 in) long.

The leaves close in the dark.

The inflorescence looks like a yellow candle.

The fruit, shaped like a straight pod, is up to 25 cm long. Its seeds are distributed by water or animals.

The seed pods (fruits) are nearly straight, dark brown or nearly black, about 15 centimetres (5.9 in) long, and 15 millimetres (0.59 in) wide. On both sides of the pods is a wing that runs the length of the pod. A pod contains 50 to 60 flattened, triangular seeds.

== Cultivation ==
This species is easy to grow from the seed. They may either be sown directly or started in a nursery.

== Medicinal uses ==
Senna alata (also known as Cassia alata) is often called the ringworm bush because of its very effective fungicidal properties, for treating ringworm and other fungal infections of the skin. The leaves are ground in a mortar to obtain a kind of "green cotton wool". This is mixed with the same amount of vegetable oil and rubbed on the affected area two or three times a day. A fresh preparation is made every day. Its active ingredients include the yellow chrysophanic acid.

Its laxative effect, due to its anthraquinone content, is also well proven.

Senna alata is locally known as akapulko in the Philippines (after the port of Acapulco) where it is used as both an ornamental and medicinal plant due to its laxative, purgative and anti-fungal properties.

In Sri Lanka, known as Ath-thora (ඇත්තෝර), it is used as an ingredient in Sinhala traditional medicine.

Yoruba of west Africa refer to it as ewe àsùnwòn.

== Images ==
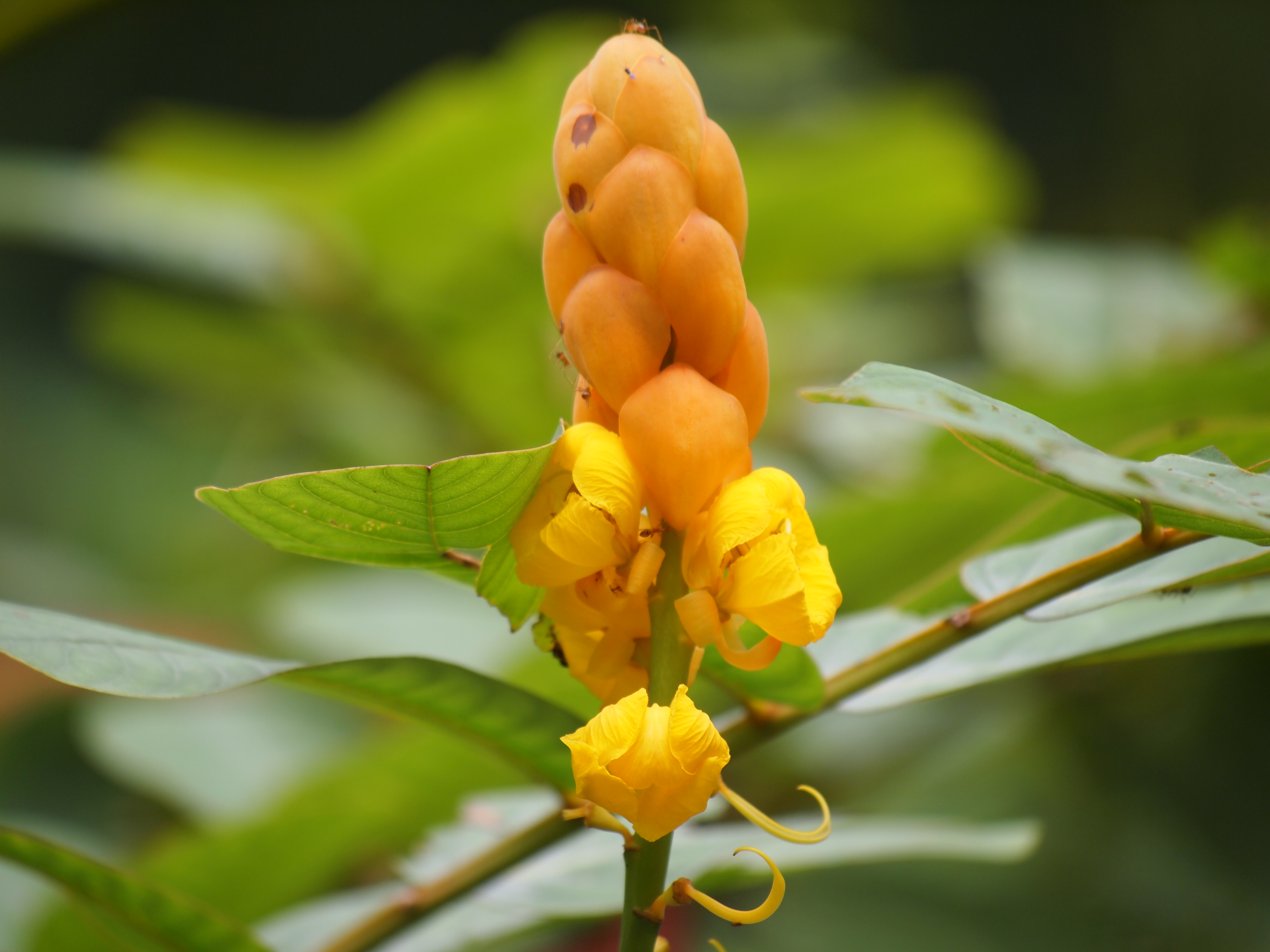
S. alata in Malaysia

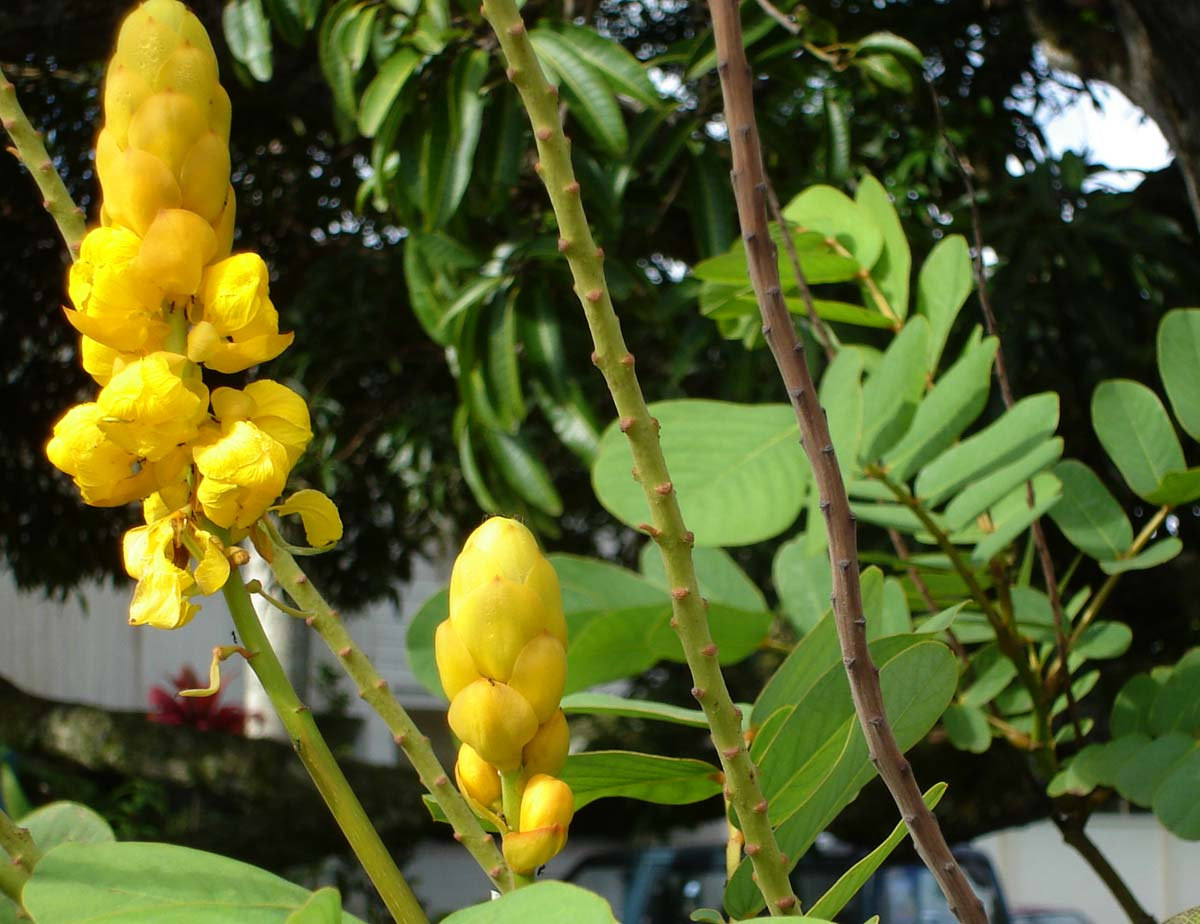
Inflorescences and foliage

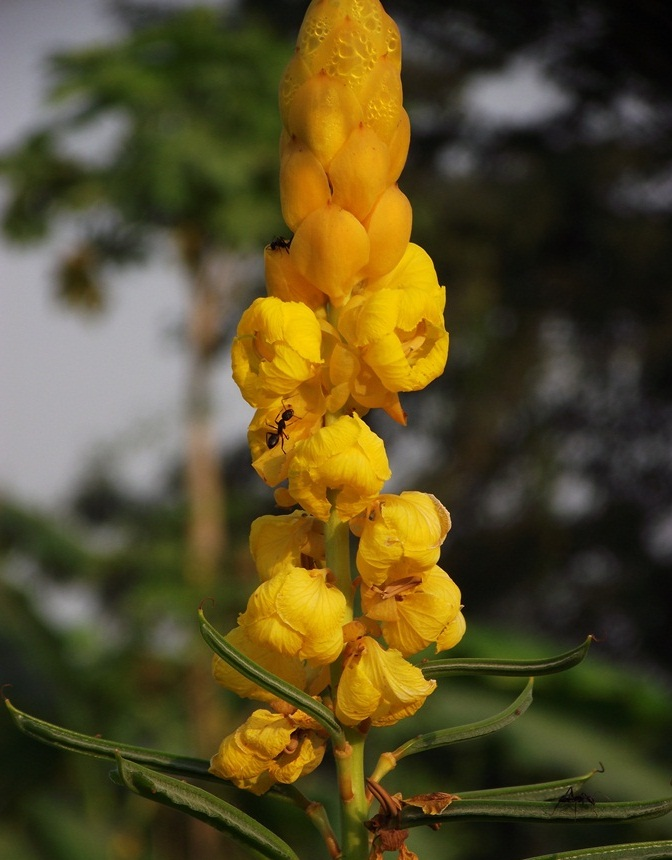
Peetambar (S. alata) flower found in Kasta (Mitauli) of Kheri District

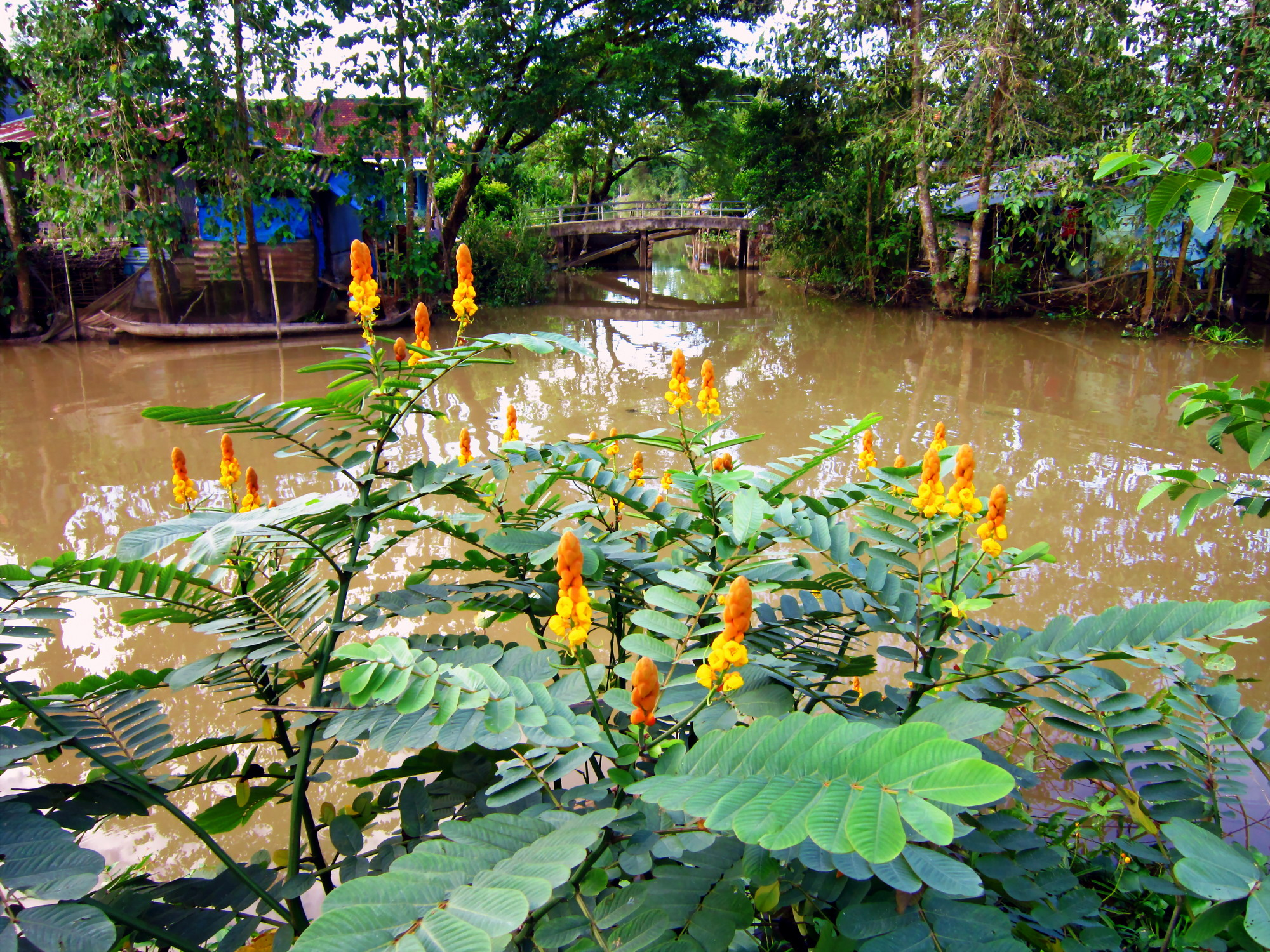
S. alata in southern Vietnam

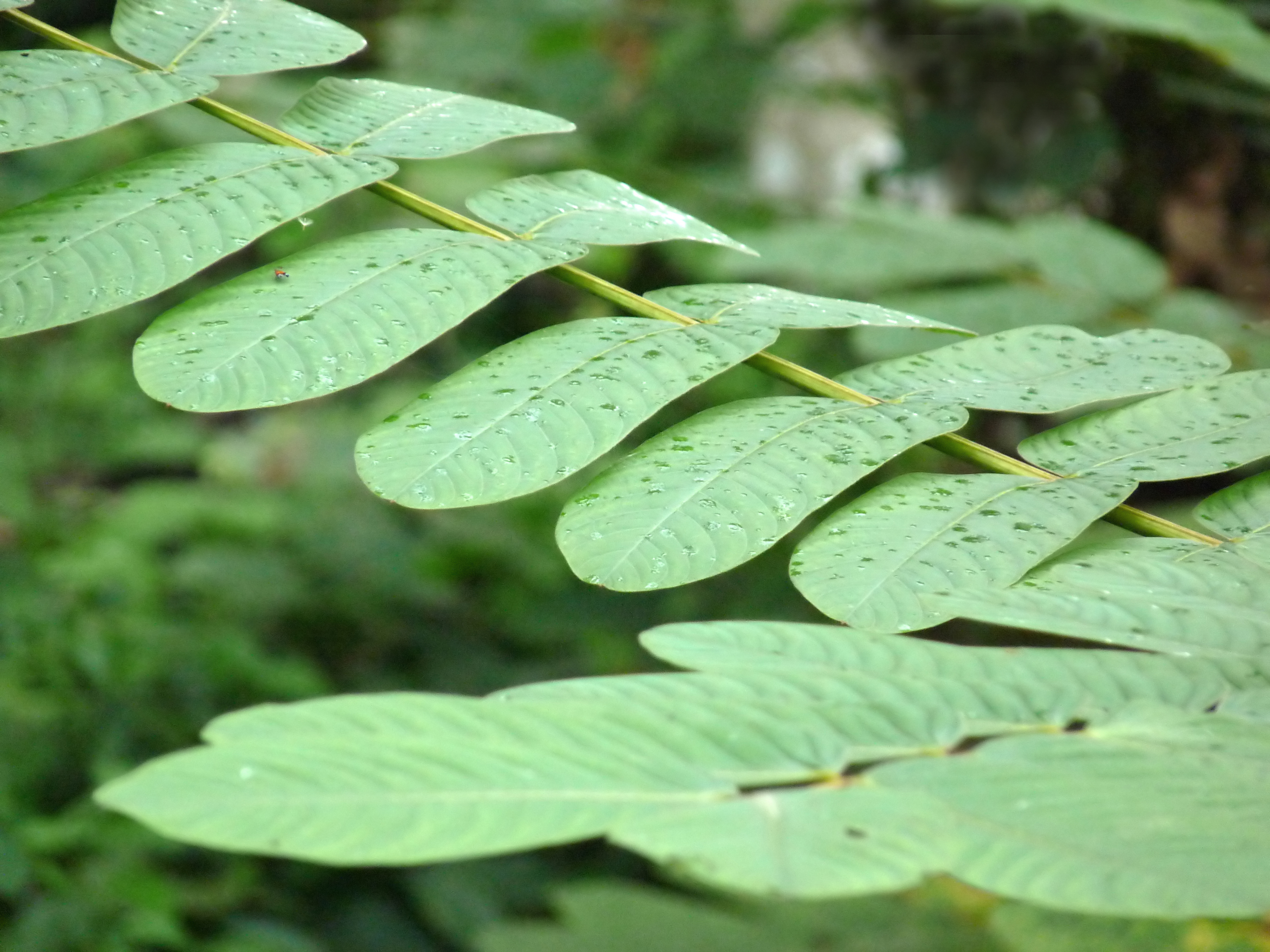
S. alata leaves

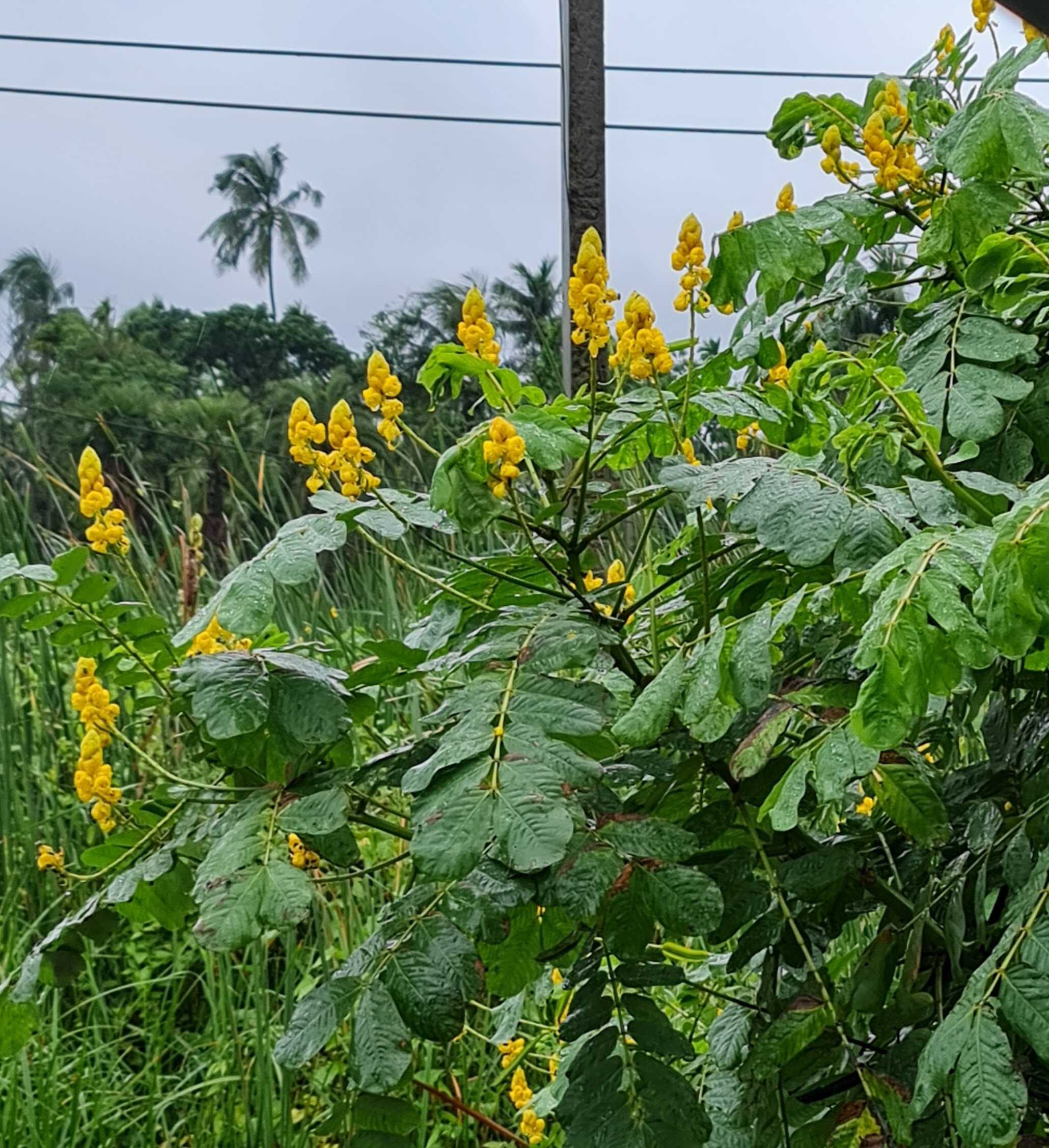

== Sources ==
- Pacific Island Ecosystems at Risk (PIER)
- International Legume Database & Information Service
