= Cadle Mission =

Episcopal boarding school in Wisconsin, US

Coordinates: 44°28′43″N 88°01′42″W

The Cadle Mission, an Episcopal boarding school that operated in Allouez, Wisconsin, between 1827 and 1839, was named for its charter superintendent, the Rev. Richard Fish Cadle, a New Yorker who came to Green Bay via Detroit.

Its boarders were mostly the children of Native Americans or "half-breeds", according to documents held by the Wisconsin State Historical Society. A handful of white children attended as day students.

== History ==
For a decade, the Cadle Mission, run by Cadle and his sister Sarah, taught reading, writing, manners and discipline. Up to six teachers staffed it, depending on enrollment, which fluctuated erratically due to expulsions, readmissions and dropouts.

By 1831, the Cadle Mission housed 129 children between the ages of 4 and 14 from ten tribes, according to memoirs of the editor of the Green Bay Intelligencer, Andrew Ellis. Other reports say the school peaked at around 200 students.

Within eight years the mission dwindled to 36 students. It disbanded after the Native American children reportedly rebelled at being confined in a boarding school.

For that reason and others, the mission had detractors. The French settlers in Green Bay "disliked the enterprise both because it was a Protestant mission and because it did not accord with their notion of the fitness of things," according to the diaries of "Journal of An Episcopalian Missionary's Tour to Green Bay, 1834," by Jackson Kemper, a bishop and missionary sent from New York to check up on Cadle's performance.

The mission's area spanned about from what is now West Miramar Drive south to Whitney Way, Richard Stolz of Allouez said. It consisted of several buildings and a barn, with separate sleeping quarters for boys and girls.

The mission building stood in what is now the backyard of 155 W. Mission Road.
