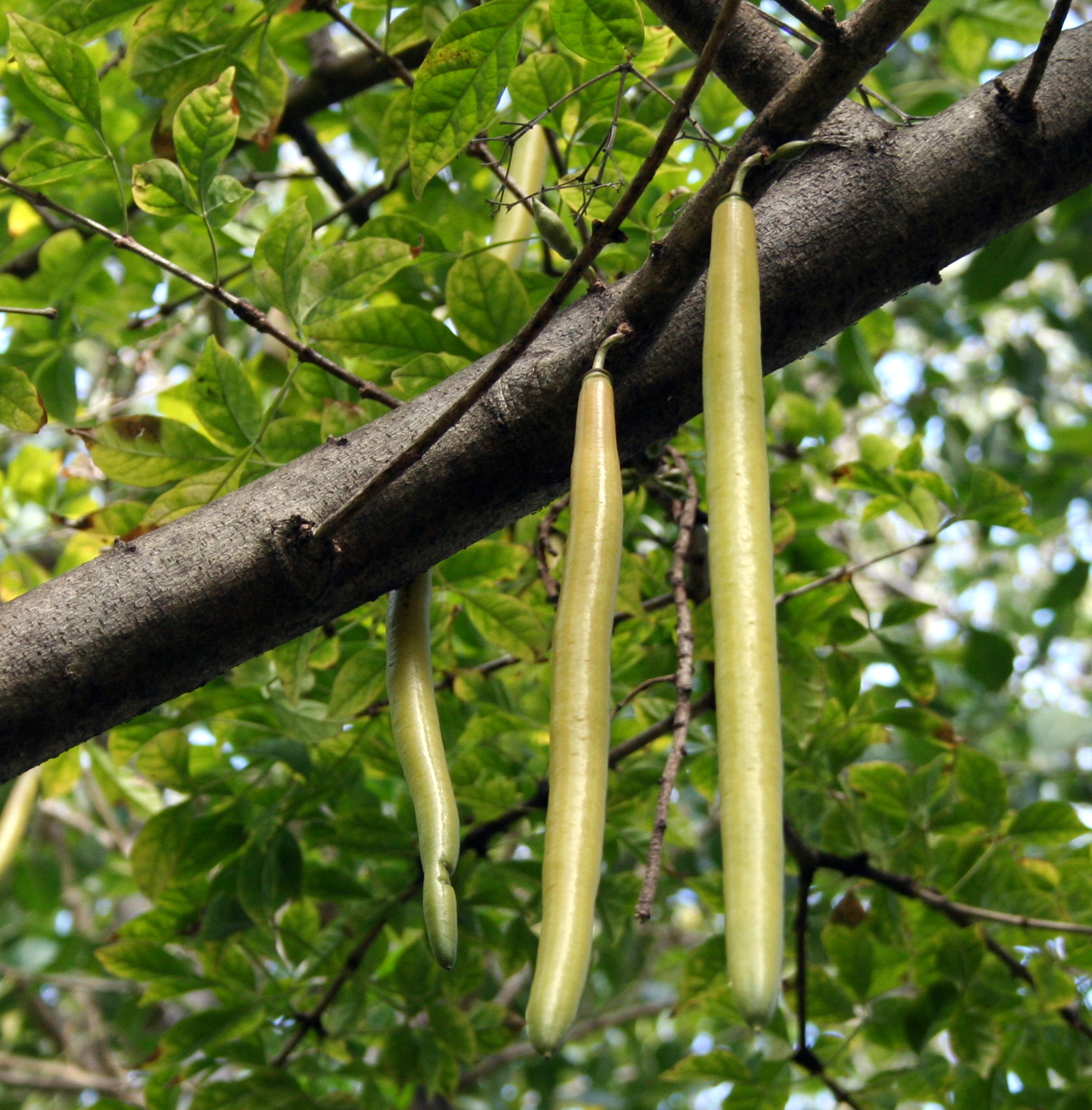
- Fruit

Conservation status
- Endangered (IUCN 2.3)

Scientific classification
- Kingdom: Plantae
- Clade: Tracheophytes
- Clade: Angiosperms
- Clade: Eudicots
- Clade: Asterids
- Order: Lamiales
- Family: Bignoniaceae
- Genus: Parmentiera
- Species: P. cereifera

Binomial name
- Parmentiera cereifera Seem.

= Parmentiera cereifera =

Species of tree

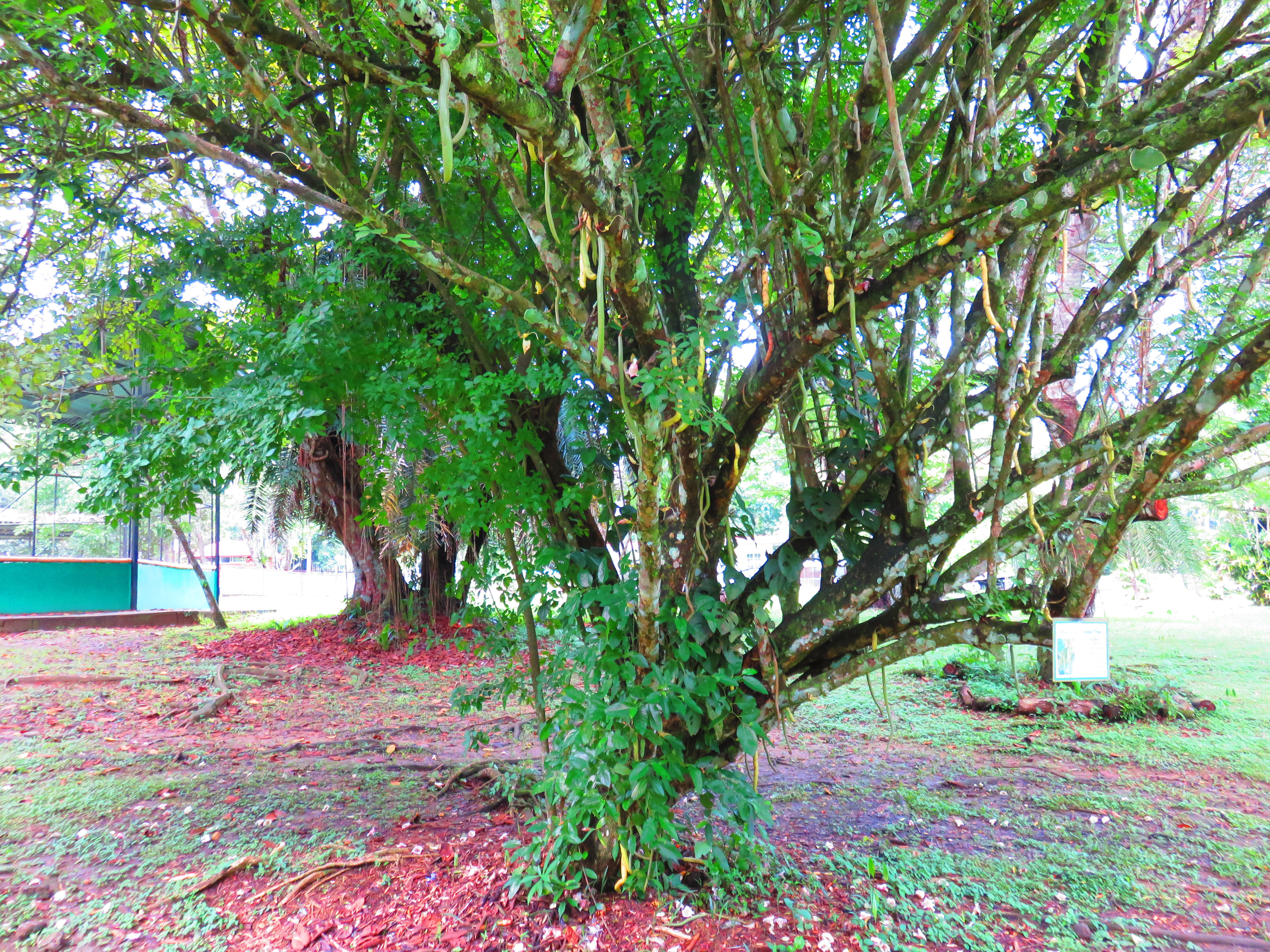
Candle tree (Parmentiera cereifera), Parque Municipal Summit, Panama

Parmentiera cereifera, the candle tree, is a species of tree in the family Bignoniaceae. It is endemic to Panama, but it is also a commonly cultivated specimen in botanical gardens.

This tree grows up to 6 m tall. The leaves are arranged oppositely, each made up of three leaflets. They are borne on winged petioles up to 5 cm long. The flower is solitary or borne in a cluster of up to four. The five-lobed corolla is greenish white. The fruit is a taper-shaped berry up to 60 cm long. The record is 120 cm long while only 2.5 cm wide. It is green, ripening yellow, and waxy in texture. The fleshy fruit is edible.
