= Thomas S. Candler =

American judge (1890–1971)

- Born: December 15, 1890; Blairsville, Georgia
- Died: September 15, 1971 (aged 80); Blairsville, Georgia
- Education: Young Harris College; University of Georgia School of Law
- Occupation: Judge
- Known for: Justice of the Supreme Court of Georgia (1945–1966)

Thomas Slaughter Candler (December 15, 1890 – September 15, 1971) was a justice of the Supreme Court of Georgia from 1945 to 1966.

== Biography ==
Born in Blairsville, Georgia, Candler received a B.A. from Young Harris College in 1913, followed by a J.D. from the University of Georgia in 1915. He was shortly thereafter elected mayor of Blairsville, serving in that office from 1916 to 1920. From 1927 to 1938, he served as United States commissioner for northeast Georgia. He was judge of the Superior Court of the Northeast Circuit from 1939 to 1945, when Governor Ellis Arnall appointed Candler to a newly established seat on the state supreme court. Candler ran for election to the full term, and remained on the court until his retirement in 1966. He was at various times in his career involved in the state Democratic Party.

== Personal life and death ==
Candler had a wife, Beulah, with whom he had two daughters and one son.

He died at a hospital in Blairsville following a two-week illness, at the age of 80.

Political offices
Preceded by Newly established seat	Justice of the Supreme Court of Georgia; 1945–1966	Succeeded by Hiram K. Undercofler
