= Larijan Hot Spring =

Hot mineral spring in Amol, Iran

Larijan Hot Spring, also known as Larijan Mineral Spring or Rineh Thermal Spring (Abe garm-e-Ma'dani-e-Larijan) is a hot mineral spring located about 73 km (45 mi) south of the city of Amol, near Mount Damavand, in Iran.

It has several individual bathtubs and some public pools for visitors and bathroom. For tourists, there is hotel and motel and other residence. Larijan Hot Spring is one of the main attractions of the Mazandaran province, Iran. The main center spring in Rineh.
