= Mount Damavand =

Highest volcano in Asia

Damavand
- دماوند (Persian)
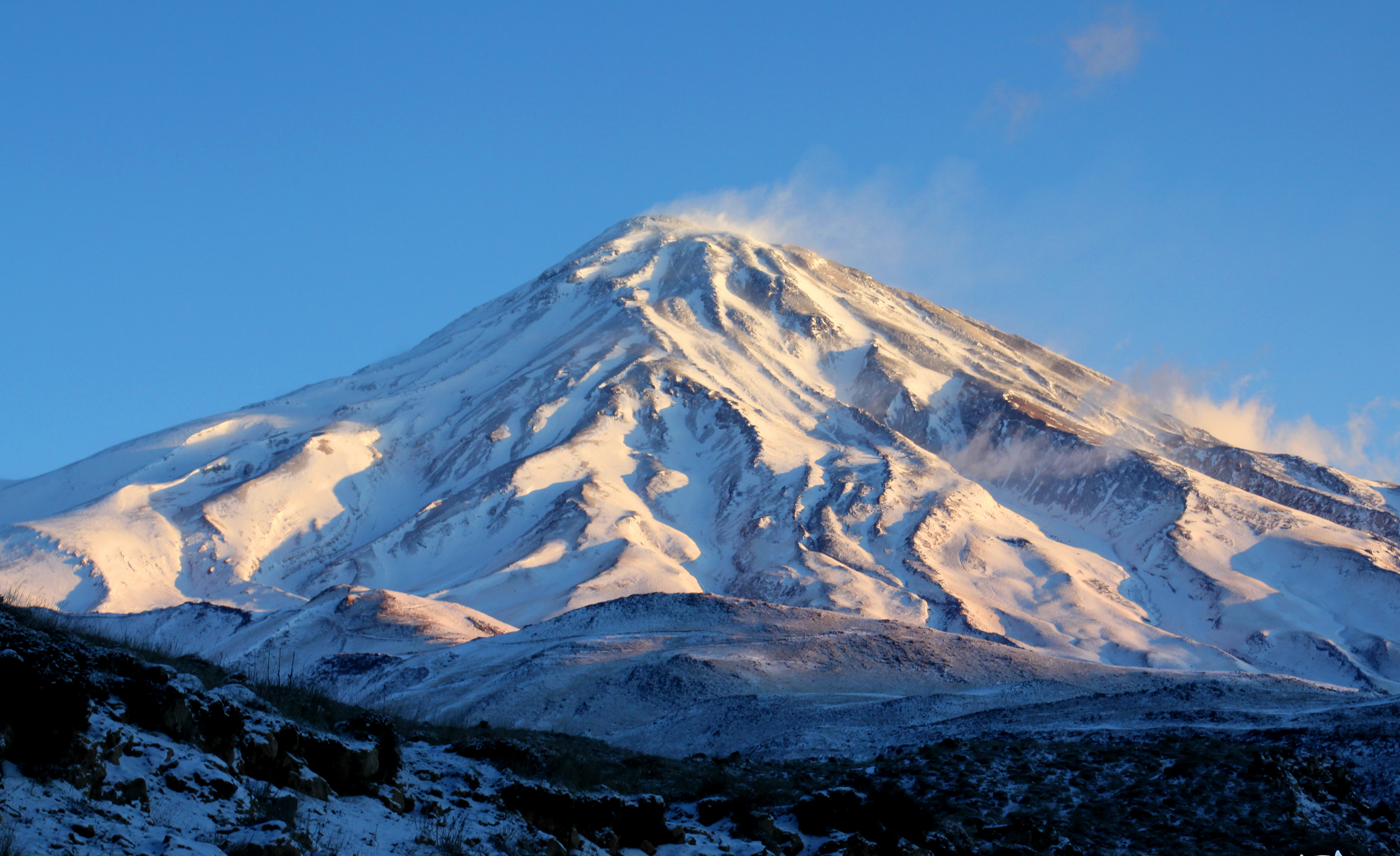
- Mount Damavand, the south side, Amol, Mazandaran province, Iran

Highest point
- Elevation: 5,610 m (18,410 ft)
- Prominence: 4,667 m (15,312 ft); Ranked 12th
- Parent peak: Mount Elbrus
- Listing: Volcanic Seven Summits; Country high point; Ultra
- Coordinates: 35°57′04″N 52°06′32″E

Naming
- Native name: دماوند

Geography
- Location within Iran
- Country: Iran
- Province: Māzandarān
- County: Amol
- Parent range: Alborz – Mazandaran

Geology
- Mountain type: Stratovolcano
- Last eruption: 5350 BC ± 200 years

Climbing
- First ascent: 905 by Abu Dolaf Kazraji
- Easiest route: Hike

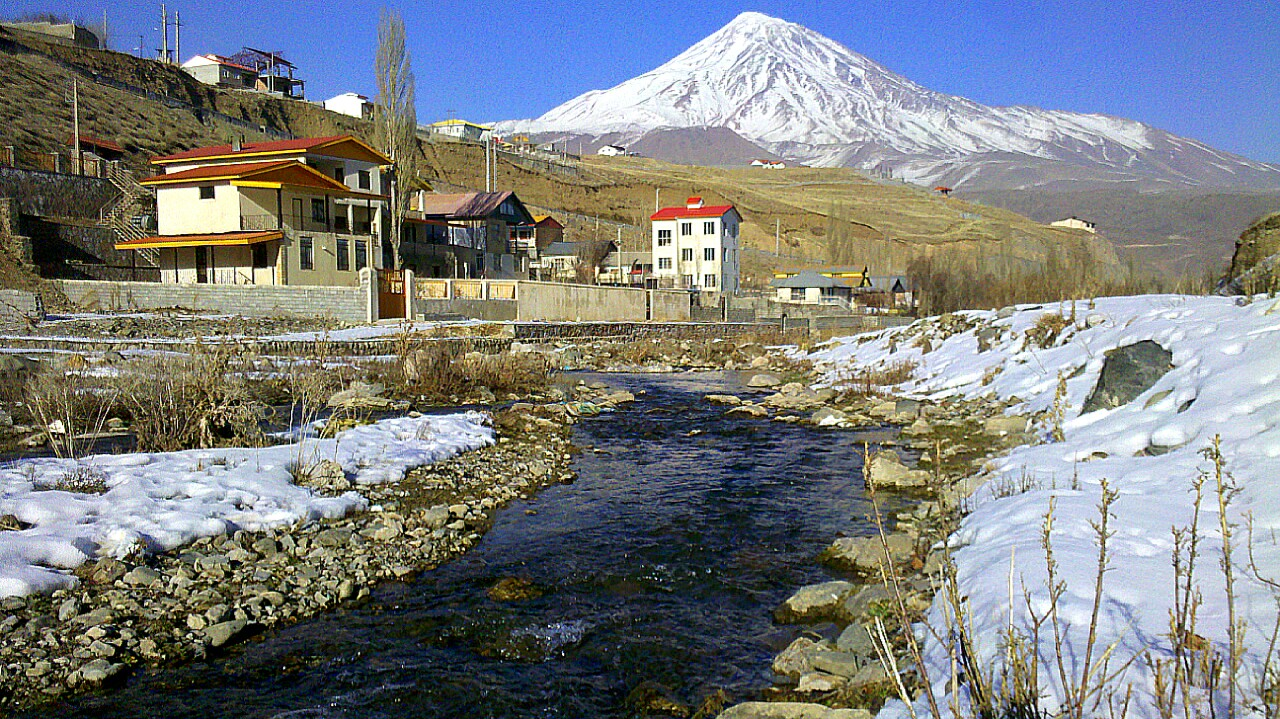
Damavand from Polour Village Amol

Mount Damavand (Persian: دماوند [dæmɒːˈvænd] English: /dɔːmoʊˈvænd/ Da-moh-VAND) is a dormant stratovolcano in Iran. It is the highest peak in Iran and Western Asia, the highest volcano in Asia, and the third highest volcano in the Eastern Hemisphere (after Mount Kilimanjaro and Mount Elbrus), at an elevation of 5,610 metres (18,410 ft). (Note: The Kunlun Volcanic Group in Tibet, higher than Damāvand, are not considered to be volcanic mountains.) Damāvand has a special place in Persian mythology and folklore. It is in the middle of the Alborz range, adjacent to Varārū, Sesang, Gol-e Zard, and Mīānrūd. It is near the southern coast of the Caspian Sea, in Amol County, Mazandaran Province, 66 km (41 mi) northeast of the city of Tehran.

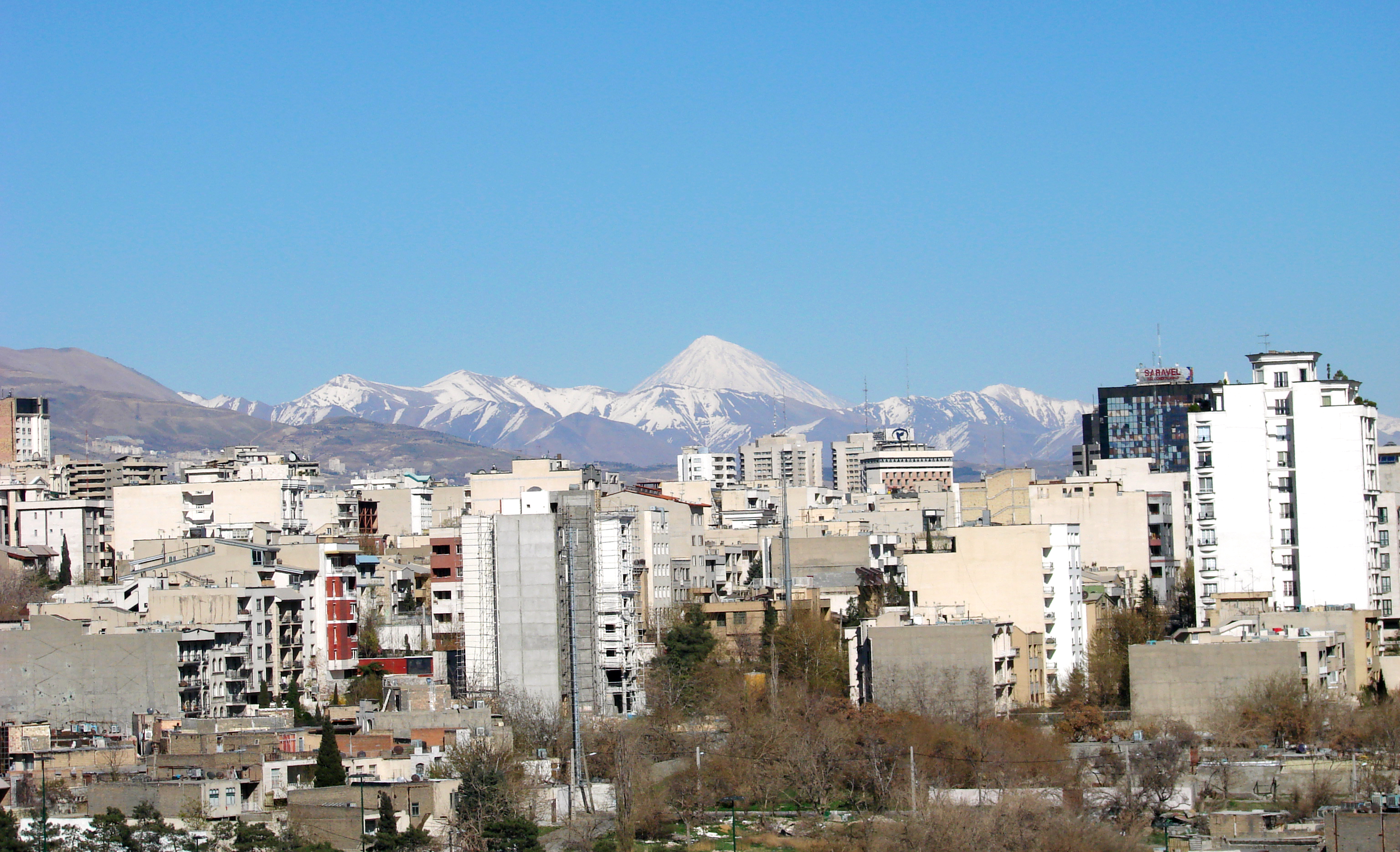
View of Damavand from Tehran

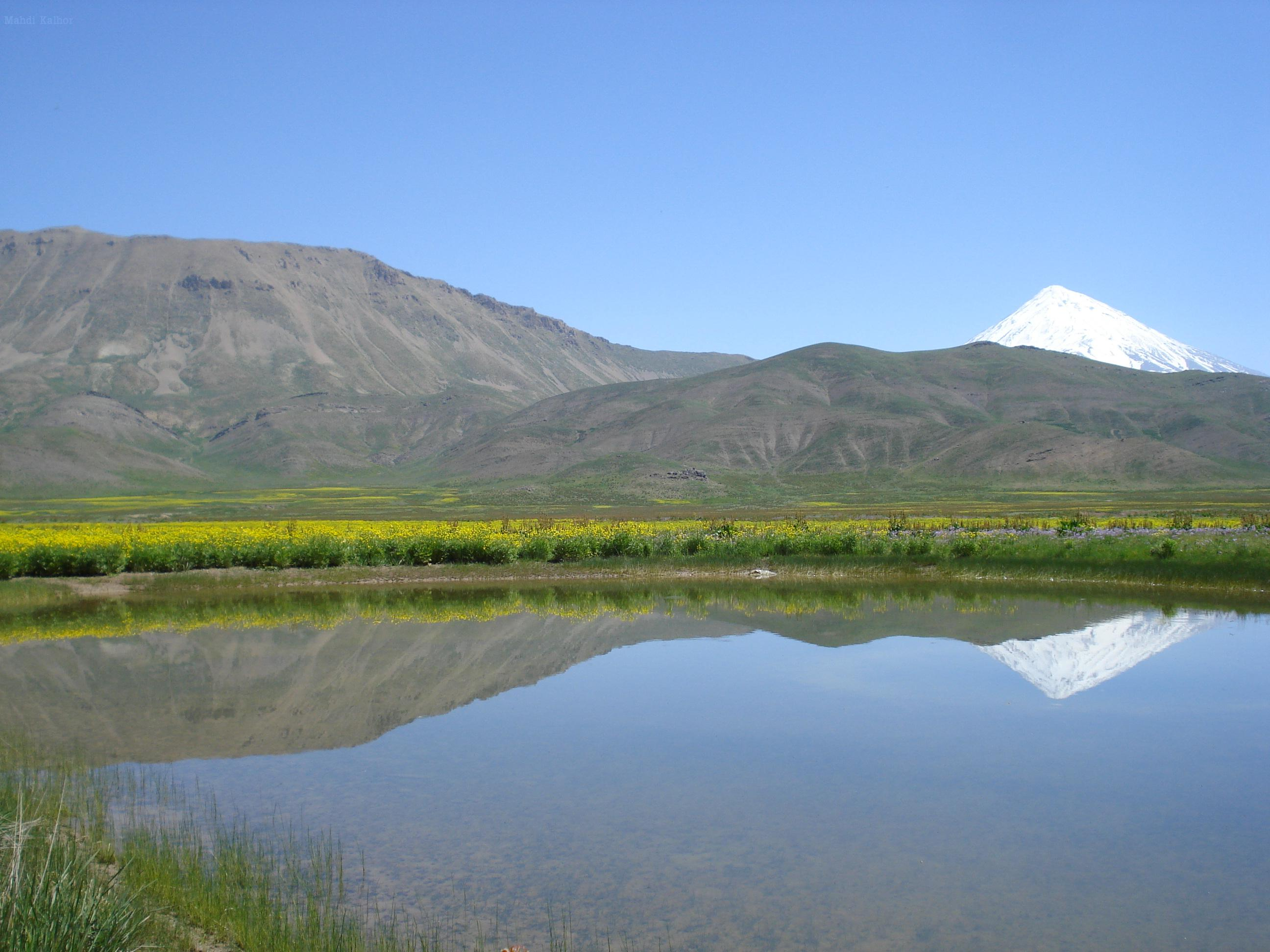
View of Damavand from near the Lar Dam

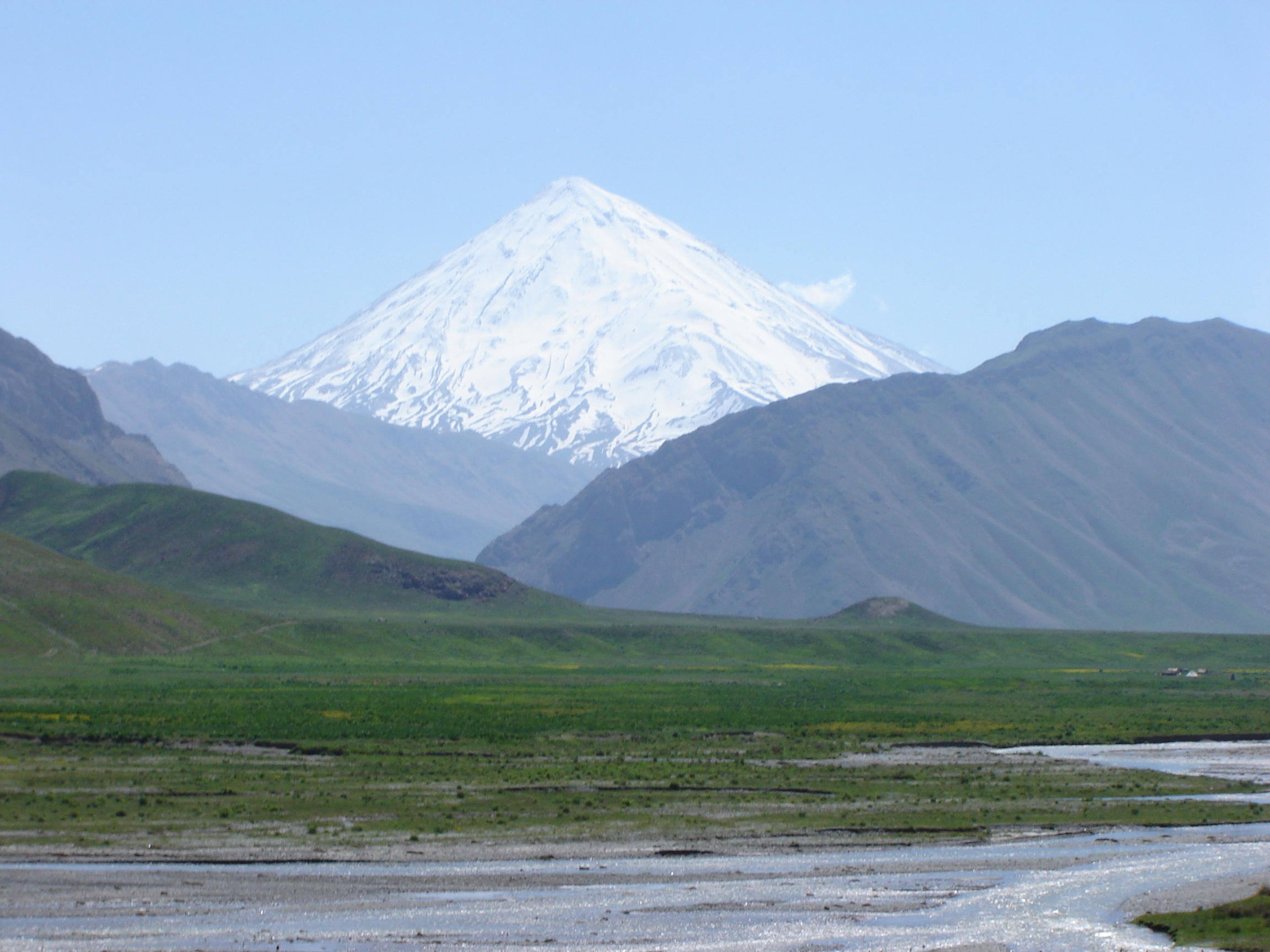
View of Damavand from Lar River

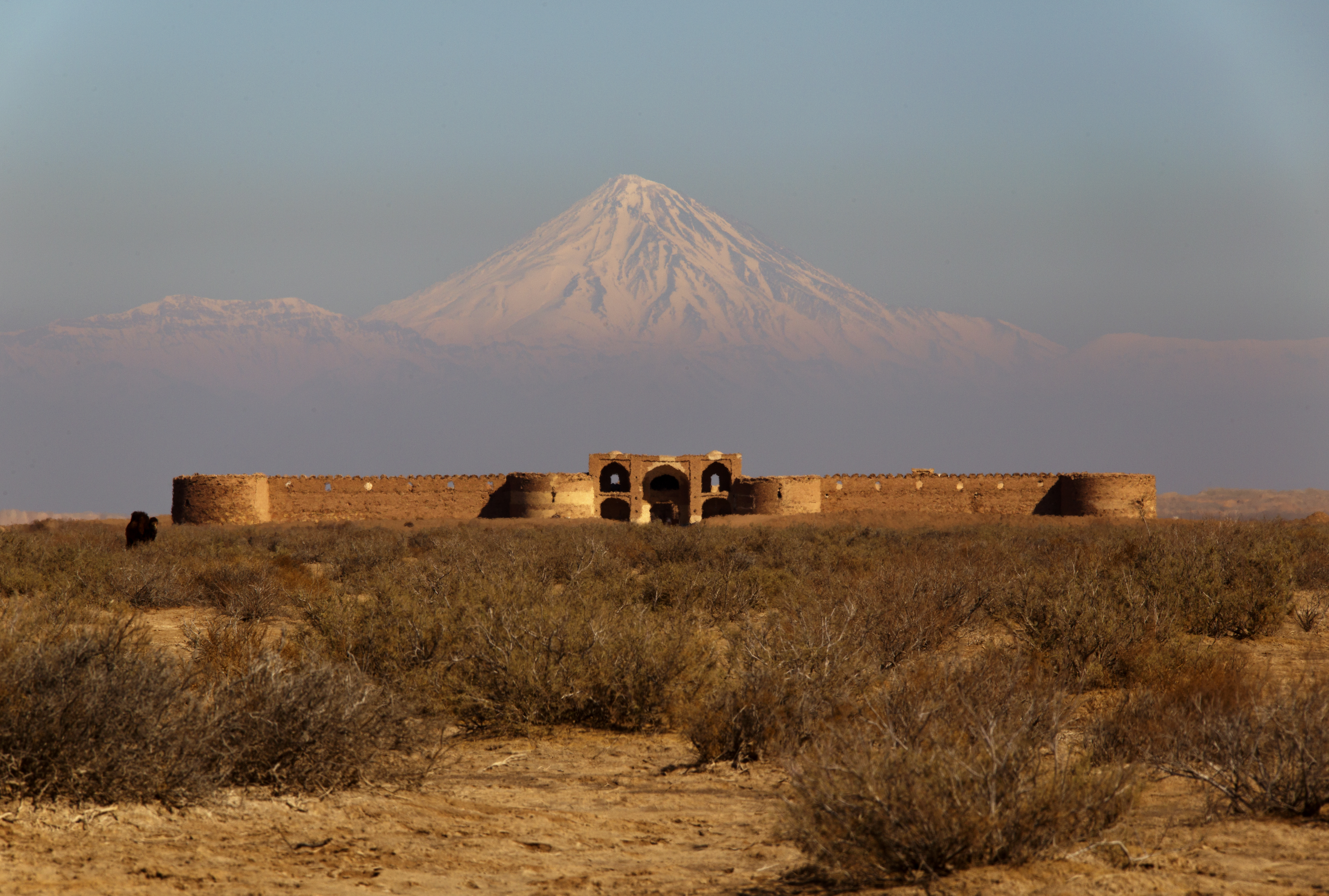
Damavand from Dayr-e Gachin caravansarai in Qom desert

Mount Damāvand is the 12th most prominent peak in the world and is part of the Volcanic Seven Summits mountaineering challenge.

== Symbolism and mythology ==
Damavand is a significant mountain in Persian mythology. It is the symbol of Iranian resistance against despotism and foreign rule in Persian poetry and literature. In Zoroastrian texts and mythology, the three-headed dragon Aži Dahāka was chained within Mount Damāvand, there to remain until the end of the world. In a later version of the same legend, the tyrant Zahhāk was also chained in a cave somewhere in Mount Damāvand after being defeated by Kāveh and Fereydūn.

The mountain is said to hold magical powers in the epic Shahnameh. Damāvand has also been named in the Iranian legend of Arash (as recounted by Bal'ami) as the location from which the hero shot his magical arrow to mark the border of Iran, during the border dispute between Iran and Turan. The poem Damāvand by Mohammad Taqī Bahār is also one example of the mountain's significance in Persian literature. The first verse of this poem reads:

ای دیو سپید پای‌دربند
ای گنبد گیتی، ای دماوند

ey div-e sepid-e pāy-dar-band,
ey gonbad-e giti, ey Damāvand

O white giant with feet in chains,
O dome of the world, O Damāvand.

Mount Damavand is depicted on the reverse of the Iranian 10,000 rial banknote.

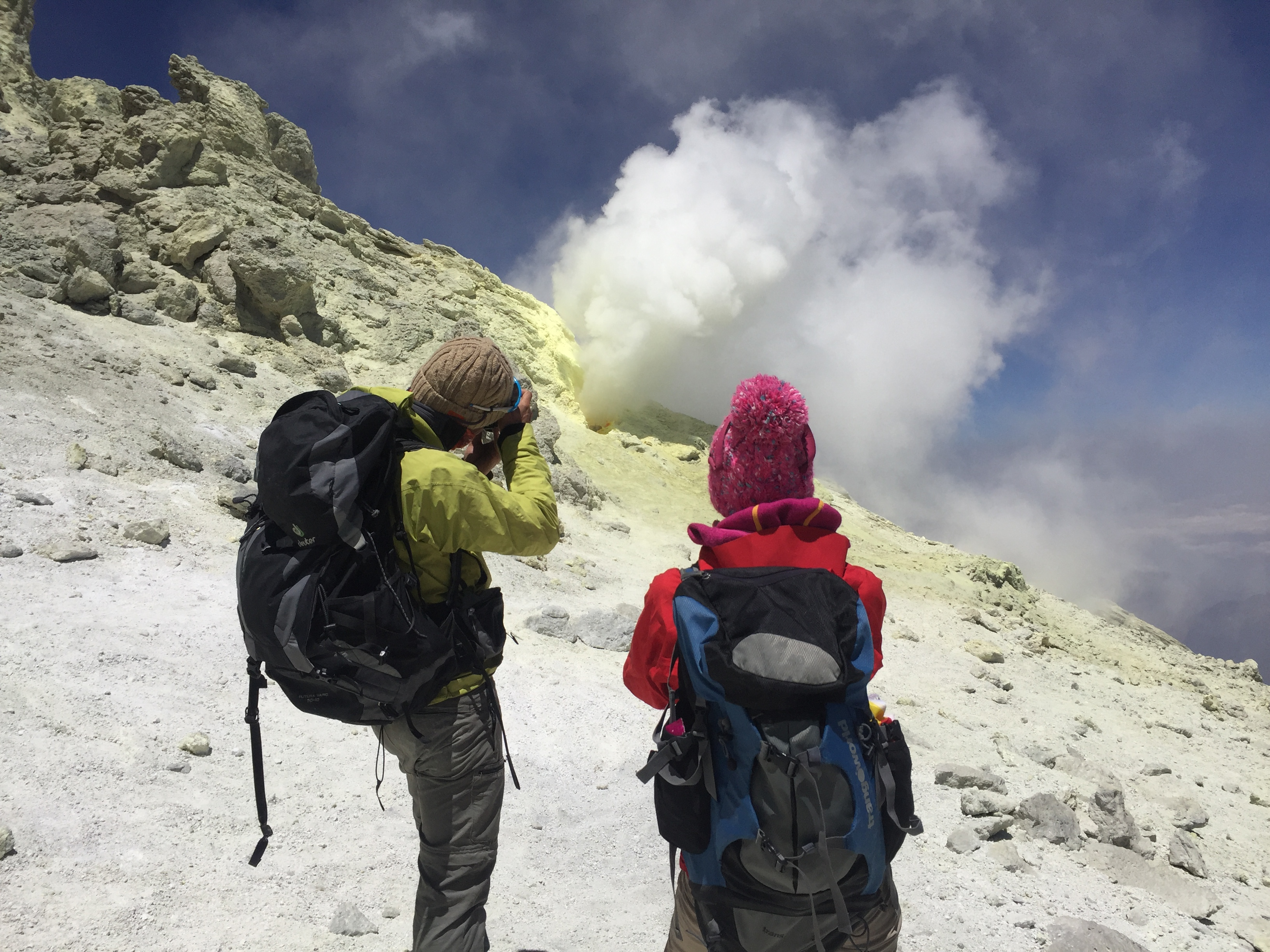
Fumarole at 5,550 metres (18,210 ft) elevation on the volcano's slope

== Geology ==
=== Setting and structure ===
Mount Damavand rises within the Alborz range in northern Iran, separating the Iranian plateau to the south from the Caspian Sea in the north. This range rises as a result of the collision between the Arabian and Eurasian tectonic plates. This collision is similar to the collision between the Indian and Eurasian plates to the east (causing the Himalaya to rise) and does not usually create volcanic activity. Despite this, recent research suggests that a hot region created by the collision is what caused the volcano to rise.

Seismic wave patterns from earthquakes around the volcano indicate that a magma chamber is present between 2 and 5 kilometres (1.2 and 3.1 mi) below the surface. This is separated into two areas - an inner region of hot, likely molten, magma between 3 and 4.5 kilometres (1.9 and 2.8 mi) depth that is surrounded by an area of dense cooled magma. The top of the chamber is believed to lie to the south of the summit, trending somewhat to the west with depth.

Most volcanic activity originates from the summit area. A few flank vents have been noted, but these are largely on the upper slopes to the southwest and northeast of the summit. A secondary crater, termed Haji Dela, has some young lava flows 4 kilometres (2.5 mi) northeast of the summit.

=== Eruptive activity ===
Volcanic activity in the Mount Damavand region first occurred in the Pleistocene almost 1.78 million years ago, but the current edifice began to be built around 600,000 years ago.

Its last eruption was around 5300 BCE in the Holocene. Its steep cone is formed of ash and lava flows mainly of trachyte, andesite, and basalt. Most eruptive activity appears to be lava flows, though some small pyroclastic flow deposits have been noted in drainages radiating from the mountain. One major explosive event is known to have erupted about 280,000 years ago.

Quaternary lavas are directly on the Jurassic sediments. The volcano is crowned by a small crater with sulfuric deposits. Despite the lack of historical eruptions, ongoing thermal activity at Mount Damavand suggests the volcano is not extinct. Subsidence at a rate of 5 millimetres (0.20 in) per year and horizontal expansion at 6 millimetres (0.24 in) per year was observed there between 2003 and 2008, but was gravity driven rather than a result of magmatic activity.

=== Thermal springs ===
Fumaroles near the summit crater of Mount Damavand in May 2014

Mineral hot springs are mainly located on the volcano's flanks and at the base, giving evidence of volcanic heat comparatively near the surface of the earth. Hot springs at the base and on the flanks and fumaroles near the summit indicate a hot or cooling magma body still present beneath the volcano. The area around the volcano is the most thermally active in Iran and the springs are being monitored to see if fluctuations in water volume and mineral content are useful in crude prediction of large regional earthquakes.

The most important of these hot springs is Larijan Hot Spring in a village by the name of Larijan in the district of Larijan Amol in Lar Valley. The water from this spring is believed to be useful in the treatment of chronic wounds and skin diseases and is bottled for distribution throughout Iran. Near these springs there are public baths with small pools for public use.

=== Glaciers ===
A few glaciers are present on the upper slopes of Damavand, the largest of which is Yakhar Glacier. During the Last Glacial Maximum, the area covered by glaciation was much larger and the climatic snow line was between 600 and 1,100 metres (2,000 and 3,600 ft) below what is seen in the present day. The glaciers on Damavand as well as a few other isolated locations are the source of the few permanently flowing rivers in Iran.

== Routes to the summit ==
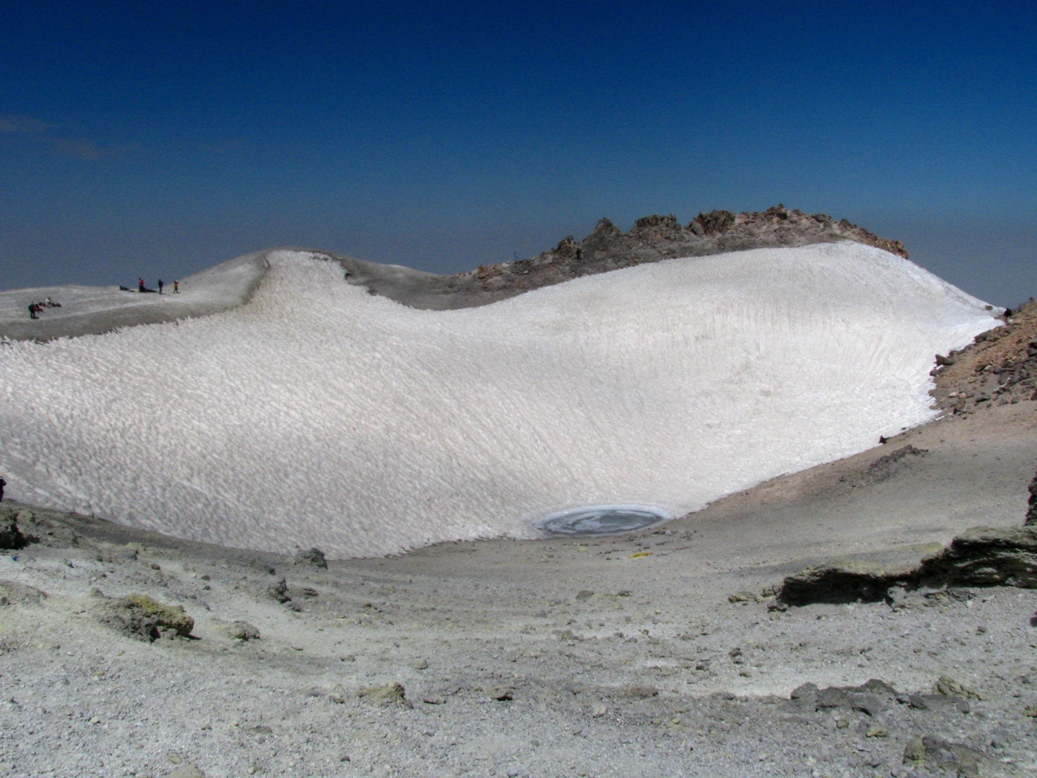
Damavand volcanic crater in August 2009

A major settlement for mountain climbers is the new Iranian Mountain Federation Camp in the village of Polour, located on the southern side of the mountain.

There are at least 16 known routes to the summit, with varying levels of difficulty. Some of them are dangerous and require ice climbing. The most popular route is the southern route which has steps and a camp midway called Bargah Sevom Camp/Shelter at 4,220 m (13,850 ft). The Northeastern route is the longest and requires two days to reach the summit starting from the downhill village of Nāndal and a night stay at Takht-e Fereydoun (elevation 4,300 m (14,100 ft), a two-story shelter. The western route is noted for its sunset view. Simurgh (Sīmorgh/Sīmurgh) shelter in this route at 4,100 m (13,500 ft) is a newly constructed two-story shelter. There is a frozen waterfall/icefall (Persian name Ābshār Yakhī) about 12 m (39 ft) tall.

== Geography ==
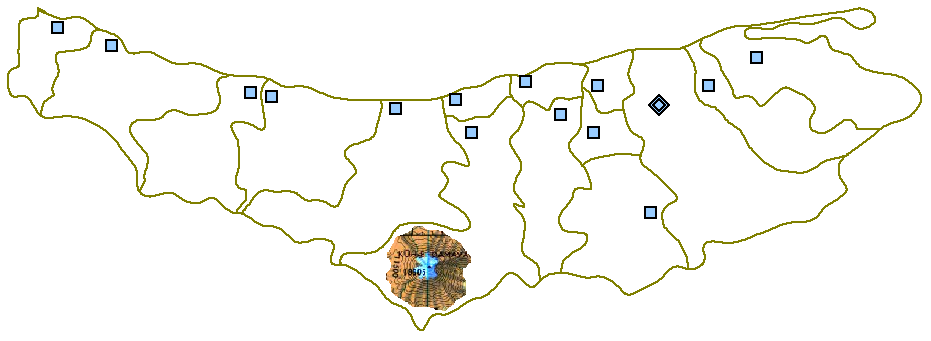
Map of Māzandarān province showing the location of mount Damāvand in the south

Map of central Alborz	Peaks:	1 Alam-Kuh
−25 to 500 m (−82 to 1,640 ft) 500 to 1,500 m (1,600 to 4,900 ft) 1,500 to 2,500 m (4,900 to 8,200 ft) 2,500 to 3,500 m (8,200 to 11,500 ft) 3,500 to 4,500 m (11,500 to 14,800 ft) 4,500 to 5,610 m (14,760 to 18,410 ft)	2 Azad Kuh	3 Damavand
−25 to 500 m (−82 to 1,640 ft) 500 to 1,500 m (1,600 to 4,900 ft) 1,500 to 2,500 m (4,900 to 8,200 ft) 2,500 to 3,500 m (8,200 to 11,500 ft) 3,500 to 4,500 m (11,500 to 14,800 ft) 4,500 to 5,610 m (14,760 to 18,410 ft)	4 Do Berar	5 Do Khaharan
−25 to 500 m (−82 to 1,640 ft) 500 to 1,500 m (1,600 to 4,900 ft) 1,500 to 2,500 m (4,900 to 8,200 ft) 2,500 to 3,500 m (8,200 to 11,500 ft) 3,500 to 4,500 m (11,500 to 14,800 ft) 4,500 to 5,610 m (14,760 to 18,410 ft)	6 Ghal'eh Gardan	7 Gorg
−25 to 500 m (−82 to 1,640 ft) 500 to 1,500 m (1,600 to 4,900 ft) 1,500 to 2,500 m (4,900 to 8,200 ft) 2,500 to 3,500 m (8,200 to 11,500 ft) 3,500 to 4,500 m (11,500 to 14,800 ft) 4,500 to 5,610 m (14,760 to 18,410 ft)	8 Kholeno	9 Mehr Chal
−25 to 500 m (−82 to 1,640 ft) 500 to 1,500 m (1,600 to 4,900 ft) 1,500 to 2,500 m (4,900 to 8,200 ft) 2,500 to 3,500 m (8,200 to 11,500 ft) 3,500 to 4,500 m (11,500 to 14,800 ft) 4,500 to 5,610 m (14,760 to 18,410 ft)	10 Mishineh Marg	11 Naz
−25 to 500 m (−82 to 1,640 ft) 500 to 1,500 m (1,600 to 4,900 ft) 1,500 to 2,500 m (4,900 to 8,200 ft) 2,500 to 3,500 m (8,200 to 11,500 ft) 3,500 to 4,500 m (11,500 to 14,800 ft) 4,500 to 5,610 m (14,760 to 18,410 ft)	12 Shah Alborz	13 Sialan
−25 to 500 m (−82 to 1,640 ft) 500 to 1,500 m (1,600 to 4,900 ft) 1,500 to 2,500 m (4,900 to 8,200 ft) 2,500 to 3,500 m (8,200 to 11,500 ft) 3,500 to 4,500 m (11,500 to 14,800 ft) 4,500 to 5,610 m (14,760 to 18,410 ft)	14 Tochal	15 Varavašt
−25 to 500 m (−82 to 1,640 ft) 500 to 1,500 m (1,600 to 4,900 ft) 1,500 to 2,500 m (4,900 to 8,200 ft) 2,500 to 3,500 m (8,200 to 11,500 ft) 3,500 to 4,500 m (11,500 to 14,800 ft) 4,500 to 5,610 m (14,760 to 18,410 ft)	Rivers:	0
−25 to 500 m (−82 to 1,640 ft) 500 to 1,500 m (1,600 to 4,900 ft) 1,500 to 2,500 m (4,900 to 8,200 ft) 2,500 to 3,500 m (8,200 to 11,500 ft) 3,500 to 4,500 m (11,500 to 14,800 ft) 4,500 to 5,610 m (14,760 to 18,410 ft)	1 Alamut	2 Chalus
−25 to 500 m (−82 to 1,640 ft) 500 to 1,500 m (1,600 to 4,900 ft) 1,500 to 2,500 m (4,900 to 8,200 ft) 2,500 to 3,500 m (8,200 to 11,500 ft) 3,500 to 4,500 m (11,500 to 14,800 ft) 4,500 to 5,610 m (14,760 to 18,410 ft)	3 Do Hezar	4 Haraz
−25 to 500 m (−82 to 1,640 ft) 500 to 1,500 m (1,600 to 4,900 ft) 1,500 to 2,500 m (4,900 to 8,200 ft) 2,500 to 3,500 m (8,200 to 11,500 ft) 3,500 to 4,500 m (11,500 to 14,800 ft) 4,500 to 5,610 m (14,760 to 18,410 ft)	5 Jajrood	6 Karaj
−25 to 500 m (−82 to 1,640 ft) 500 to 1,500 m (1,600 to 4,900 ft) 1,500 to 2,500 m (4,900 to 8,200 ft) 2,500 to 3,500 m (8,200 to 11,500 ft) 3,500 to 4,500 m (11,500 to 14,800 ft) 4,500 to 5,610 m (14,760 to 18,410 ft)	7 Kojoor	8 Lar
−25 to 500 m (−82 to 1,640 ft) 500 to 1,500 m (1,600 to 4,900 ft) 1,500 to 2,500 m (4,900 to 8,200 ft) 2,500 to 3,500 m (8,200 to 11,500 ft) 3,500 to 4,500 m (11,500 to 14,800 ft) 4,500 to 5,610 m (14,760 to 18,410 ft)	9 Noor	10 Sardab
−25 to 500 m (−82 to 1,640 ft) 500 to 1,500 m (1,600 to 4,900 ft) 1,500 to 2,500 m (4,900 to 8,200 ft) 2,500 to 3,500 m (8,200 to 11,500 ft) 3,500 to 4,500 m (11,500 to 14,800 ft) 4,500 to 5,610 m (14,760 to 18,410 ft)	11 Seh Hazar	12 Shahrood
−25 to 500 m (−82 to 1,640 ft) 500 to 1,500 m (1,600 to 4,900 ft) 1,500 to 2,500 m (4,900 to 8,200 ft) 2,500 to 3,500 m (8,200 to 11,500 ft) 3,500 to 4,500 m (11,500 to 14,800 ft) 4,500 to 5,610 m (14,760 to 18,410 ft)	Cities:	1 Amol
−25 to 500 m (−82 to 1,640 ft) 500 to 1,500 m (1,600 to 4,900 ft) 1,500 to 2,500 m (4,900 to 8,200 ft) 2,500 to 3,500 m (8,200 to 11,500 ft) 3,500 to 4,500 m (11,500 to 14,800 ft) 4,500 to 5,610 m (14,760 to 18,410 ft)	2 Chalus	3 Karaj
−25 to 500 m (−82 to 1,640 ft) 500 to 1,500 m (1,600 to 4,900 ft) 1,500 to 2,500 m (4,900 to 8,200 ft) 2,500 to 3,500 m (8,200 to 11,500 ft) 3,500 to 4,500 m (11,500 to 14,800 ft) 4,500 to 5,610 m (14,760 to 18,410 ft)	Other:	D Dizin
−25 to 500 m (−82 to 1,640 ft) 500 to 1,500 m (1,600 to 4,900 ft) 1,500 to 2,500 m (4,900 to 8,200 ft) 2,500 to 3,500 m (8,200 to 11,500 ft) 3,500 to 4,500 m (11,500 to 14,800 ft) 4,500 to 5,610 m (14,760 to 18,410 ft)	E Emamzadeh Hashem	K Kandovan Tunnel
−25 to 500 m (−82 to 1,640 ft) 500 to 1,500 m (1,600 to 4,900 ft) 1,500 to 2,500 m (4,900 to 8,200 ft) 2,500 to 3,500 m (8,200 to 11,500 ft) 3,500 to 4,500 m (11,500 to 14,800 ft) 4,500 to 5,610 m (14,760 to 18,410 ft)	* Latyan Dam	** Lar Dam

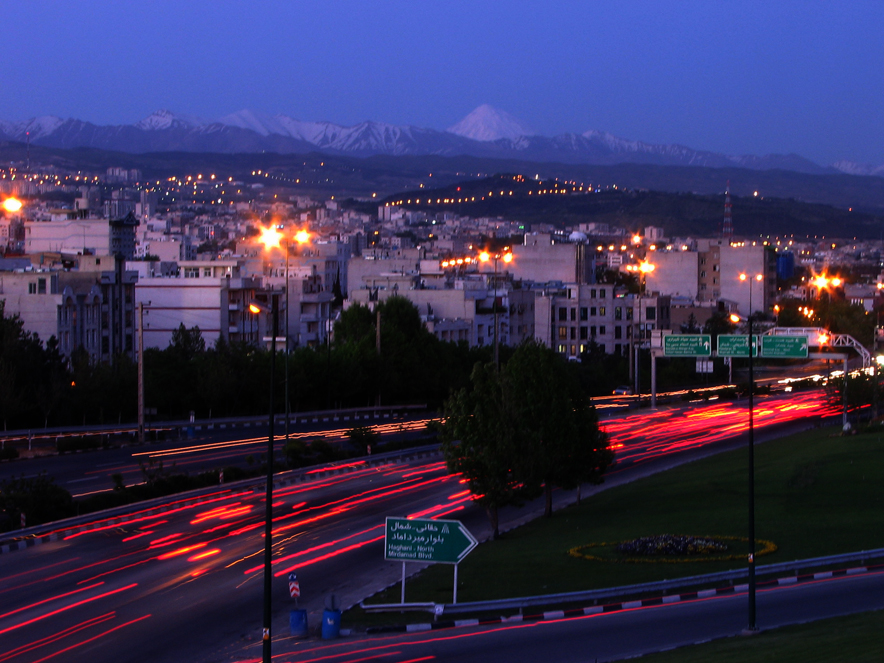
A view of Damavand peak from Tehran

== Wildlife ==
=== Fish ===
Damavand's rivers have brown trout (Salmo trutta).

=== Mammals ===
Armenian mouflon (Ovis orientalis) and wild goat (Capra aegagrus) live in the region of Damavand Mts. Persian leopard (Panthera pardus saxicolor) and Syrian brown bear (Ursus arctos syriacus) also inhabit in this region. Smaller mammals include the snow vole (Chionomys nivalis), mouse-like hamster (Calomyscus bailwardi) and Afghan pika (Ochoton rufescens).

=== Birds ===
The Caspian snowcock (Tetraogallus caspius) lives at high altitudes. Golden eagle (Aquila chrysaetos) breeds in this area. Griffon vultures (Gyps fulvus) are common. Chukar partridge (Alectoris chukar) has a high population and nests between stone and shrubs. Red-fronted serin (Serinus pusillus), linnet (Carduelis cannabina), snow finch (Montifringilla nivalis), rock sparrow (Petronia petronia), rock bunting (Emberiza cia) and horned lark (Eremophila alpestris) are native; in winter they come to the lower hillsides. In spring northern wheatear (Oenanthe oenanthe), rock thrush (Monticola saxatilis), and nightingale (Luscinia megarhynchos) come from Africa for breeding. Grey-necked bunting (Emberiza buchanani), black-headed bunting (Emberiza melanocephala) and common rosefinch (Carpodacus erythrinus) come from India.

=== Reptiles and amphibians ===
Marsh frogs (Rana ridibunda) live in Lar riversides. Meadow viper (Vipera ursinii), blunt-nosed viper (Macrovipera lebetina), Iranian valley viper (Vipera latifii) and Caucasian agama (Laudakia caucasia) are among the reptiles of this mountainous region.

=== Flora ===
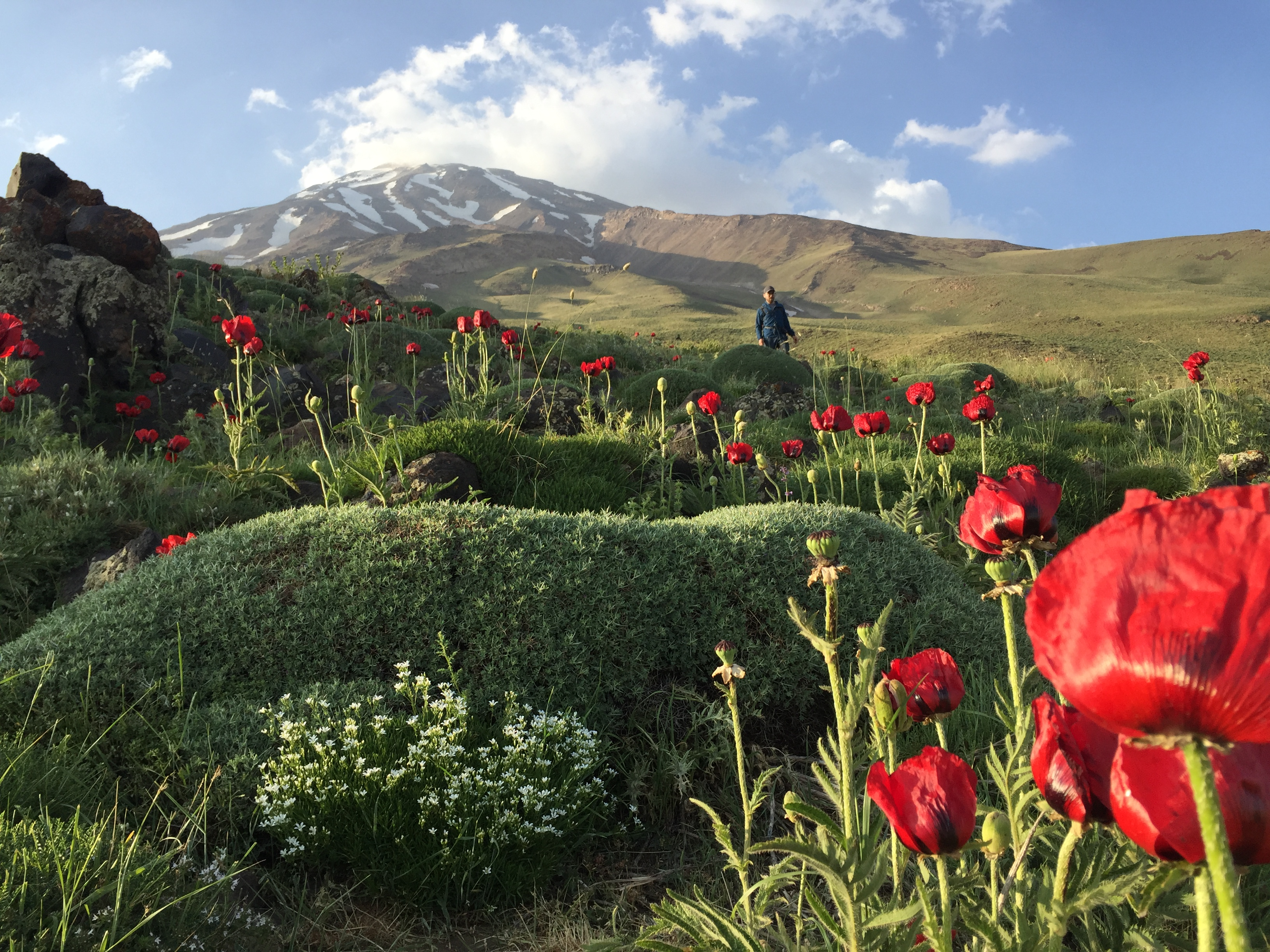
From mid-May to mid-June the foothills of Damavand are covered in red poppies.

On the southern slope of Damavand, there are remnants of wild pistachio trees (Pistacia atlantica). Along its riversides different kinds of Salix trees like willow (Salix acomphylla) and oleaster (Elaeagnus angustifolia) are found. Greek juniper (Juniperus excelsa) is common in the higher altitudes. On northern slopes, because of higher humidity, there are wild oak, beech, hornbeam and hazel trees like: Persian oak (Quercus macranthera), Oriental beech (Fagus orientalis), Eastern hornbeam (Carpinus orientalis), and Turkish hazel (Corylus colurna). There are also many wild flowers such as mountain tulip (Tulipa montana) and Persian stone cress (Aethionema grandiflorum). At higher altitudes, shrubs tend to be sphere and cushion like, examples are: Astragalus species (Astragalus microcephalus), mountain sainfoin (Onobrychis cornuta) and prickly (Acantholimon erinaceum). Different kinds of grasses complete this alpine scene. Iris barnumiae demawendica (formerly Iris demawendica), is found and named after the mountain.

== Festival ==
Since 2008, Tir 13th (July 2nd, 3rd or 4th), the day of Tirgan festival, has been named "Damavand National Day" by Iranian Cultural Heritage and Tourism Organization .On that day, Damavand was chosen as the first natural registered site of Iran.

== Gallery ==
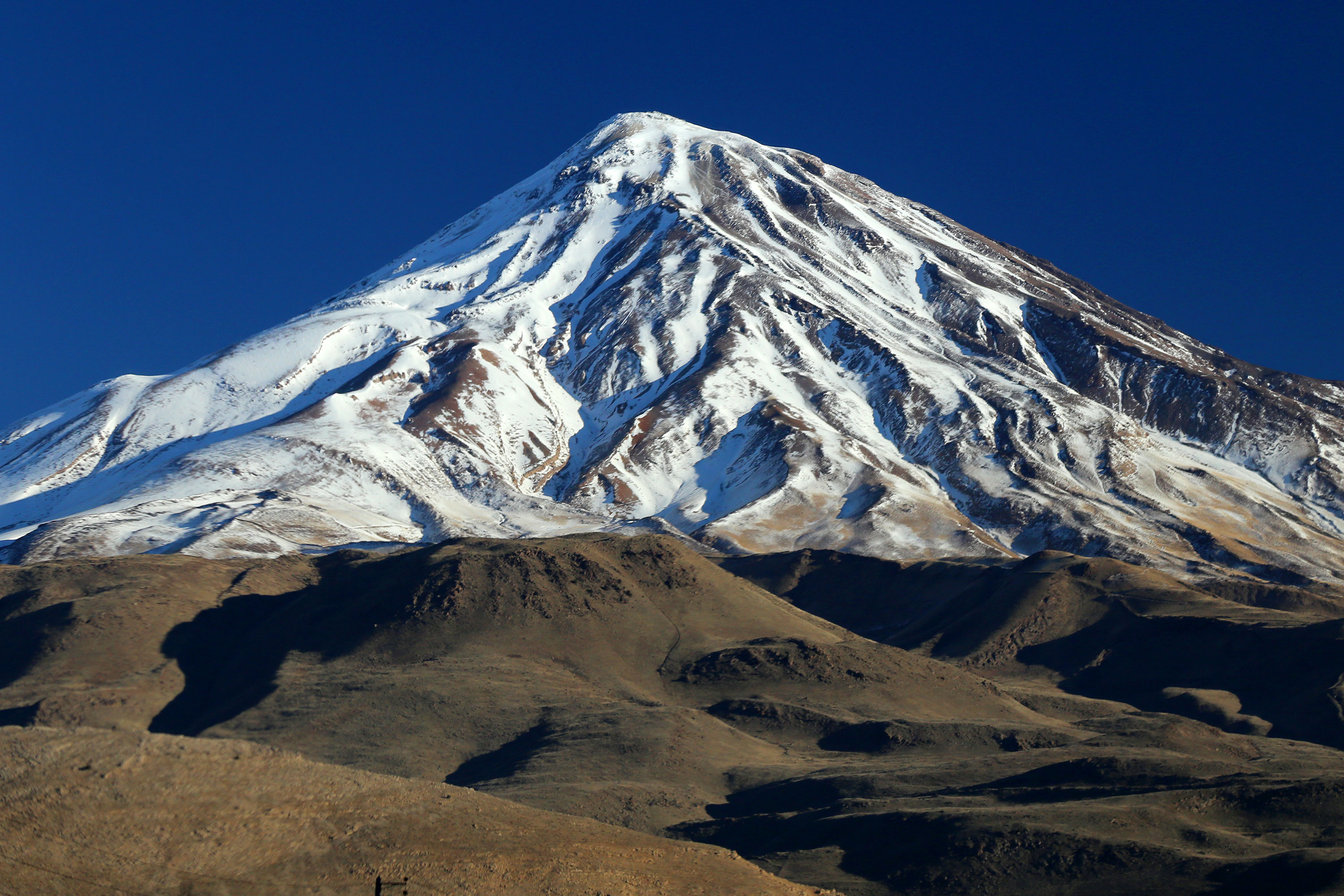
Damavand, Polour, December 2024

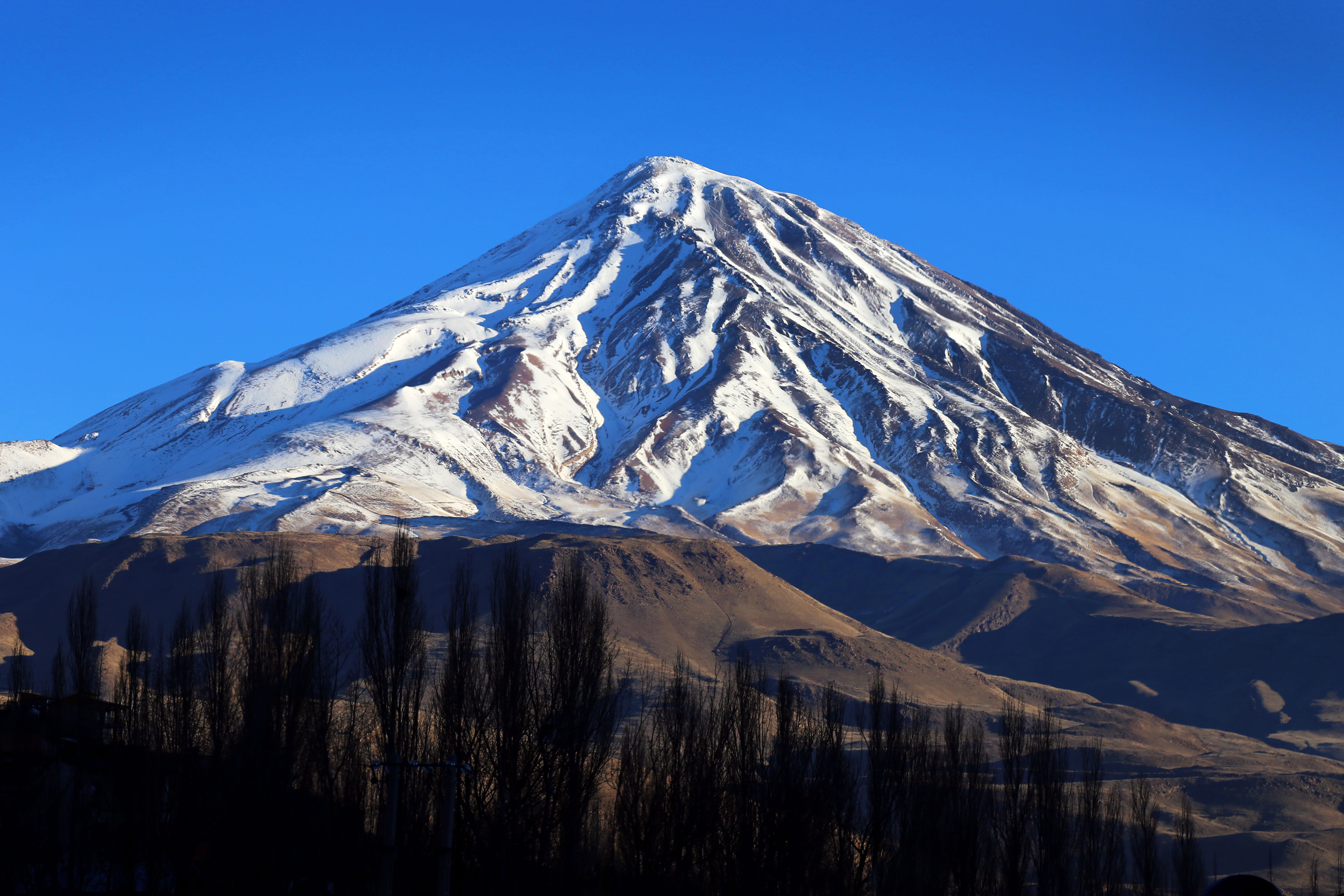
Damavand, Polour, December 2024

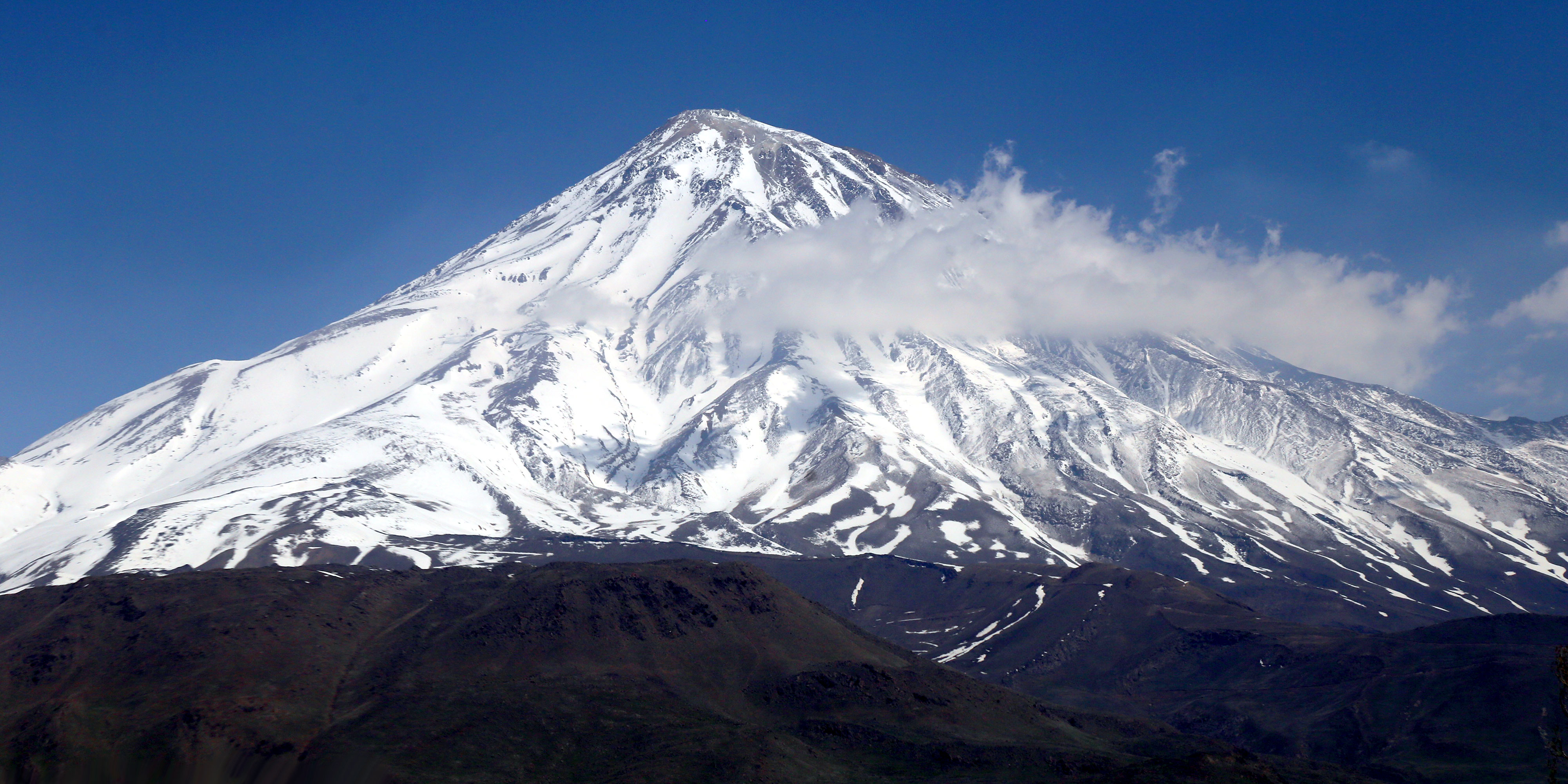
Mount Damavand

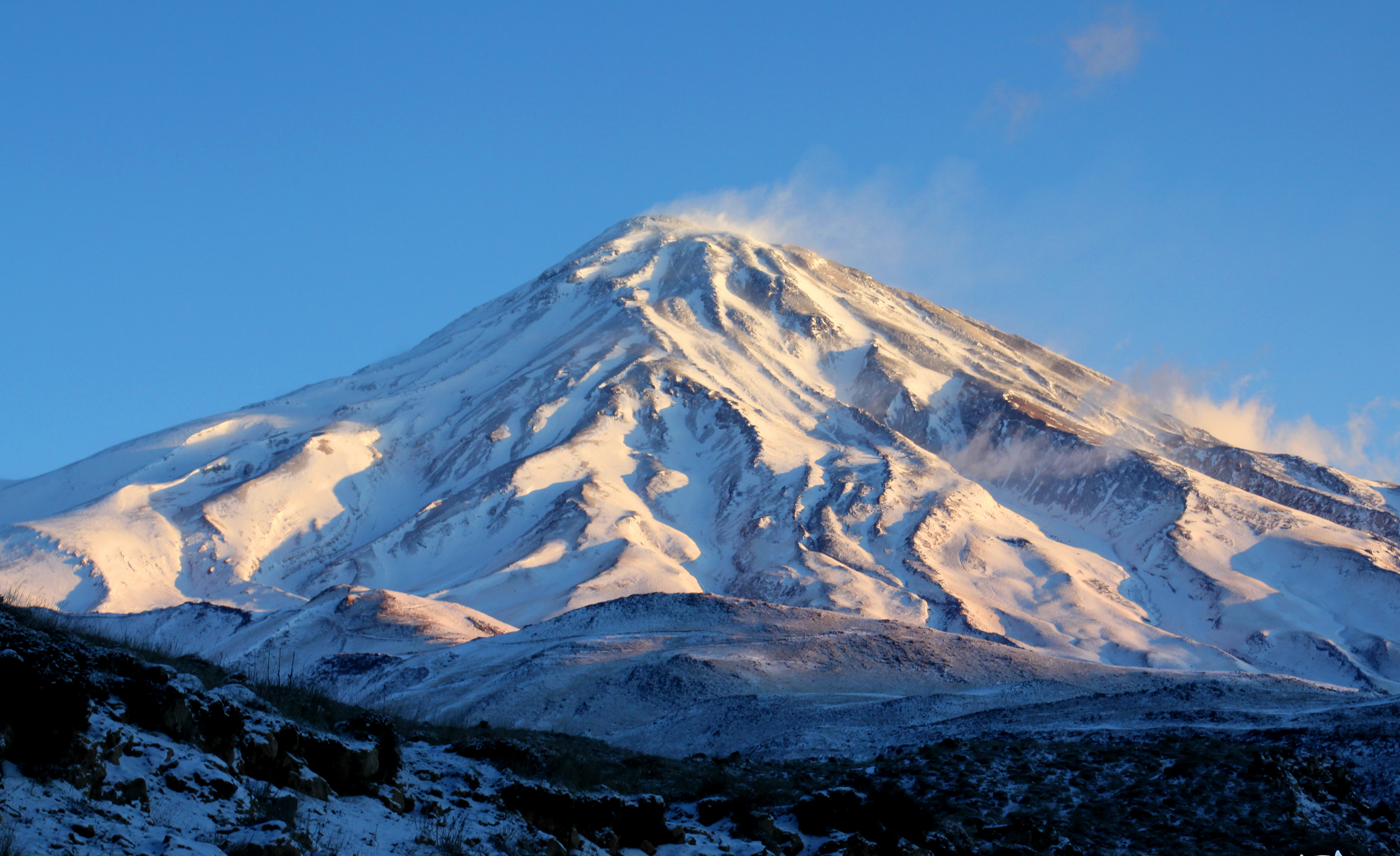
Mount Damavand, January

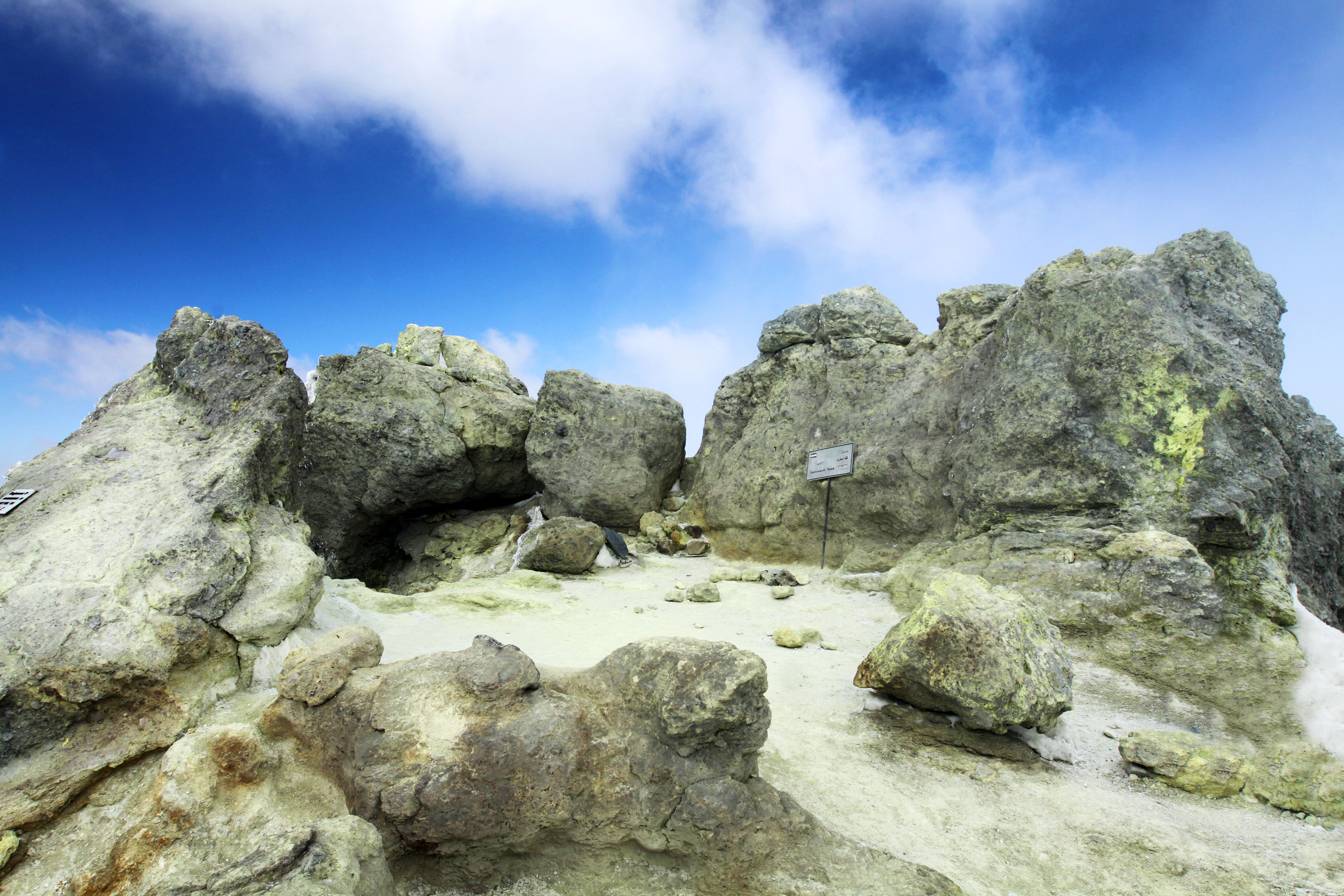
Damavand Summit (5610m)

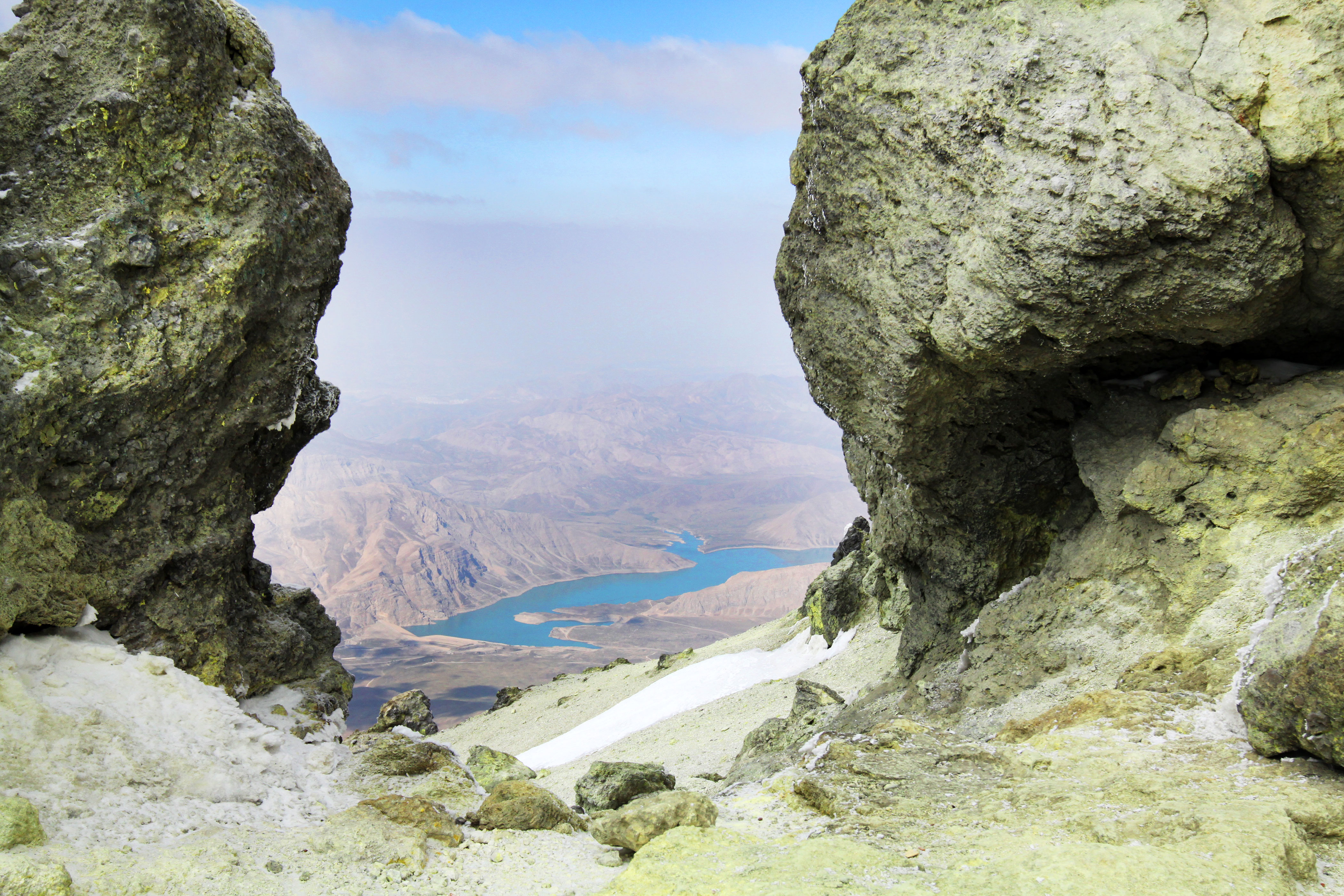
Damavand Summit (5610m), Lar Lake

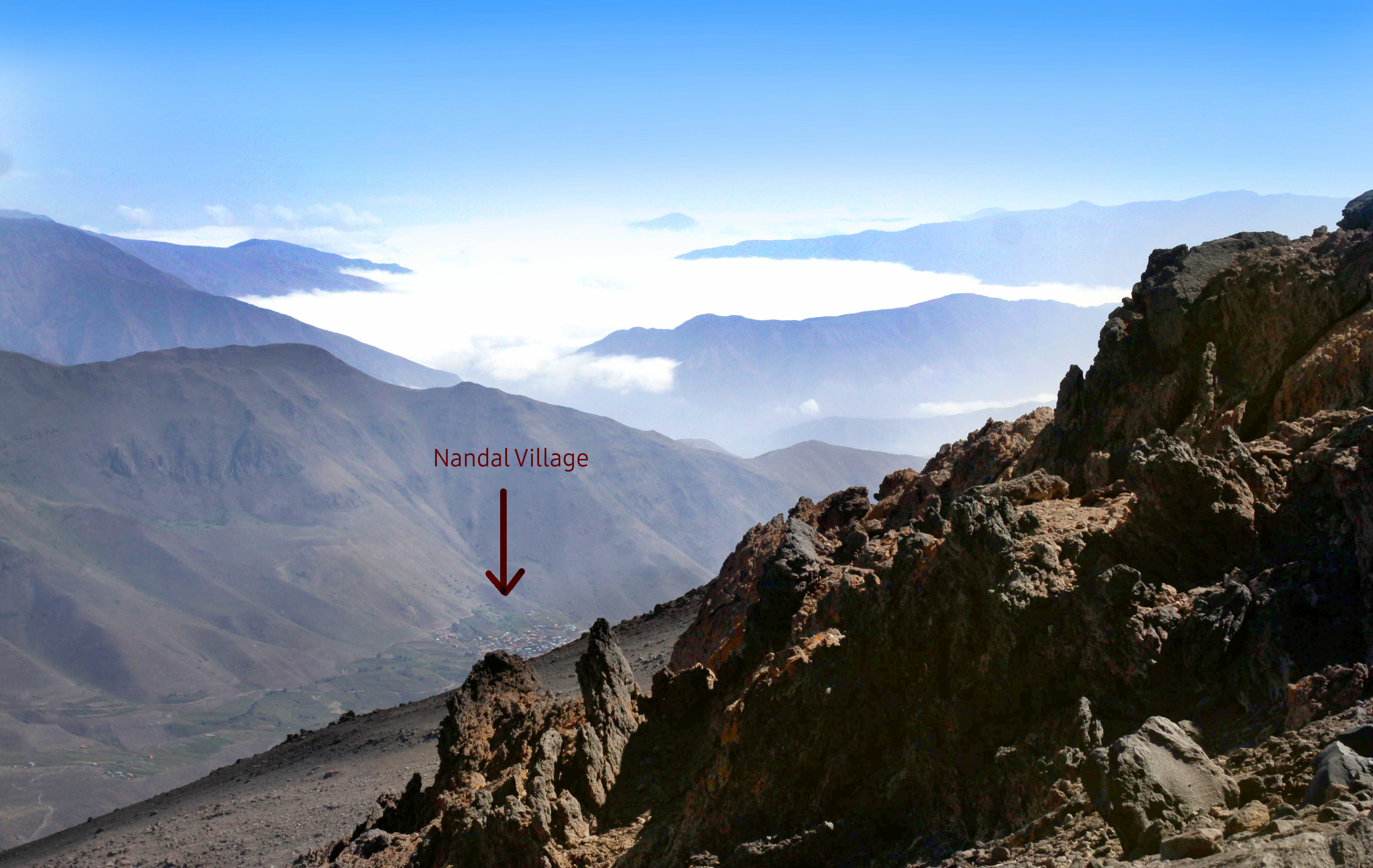
Yaledagh, Mount Damavand

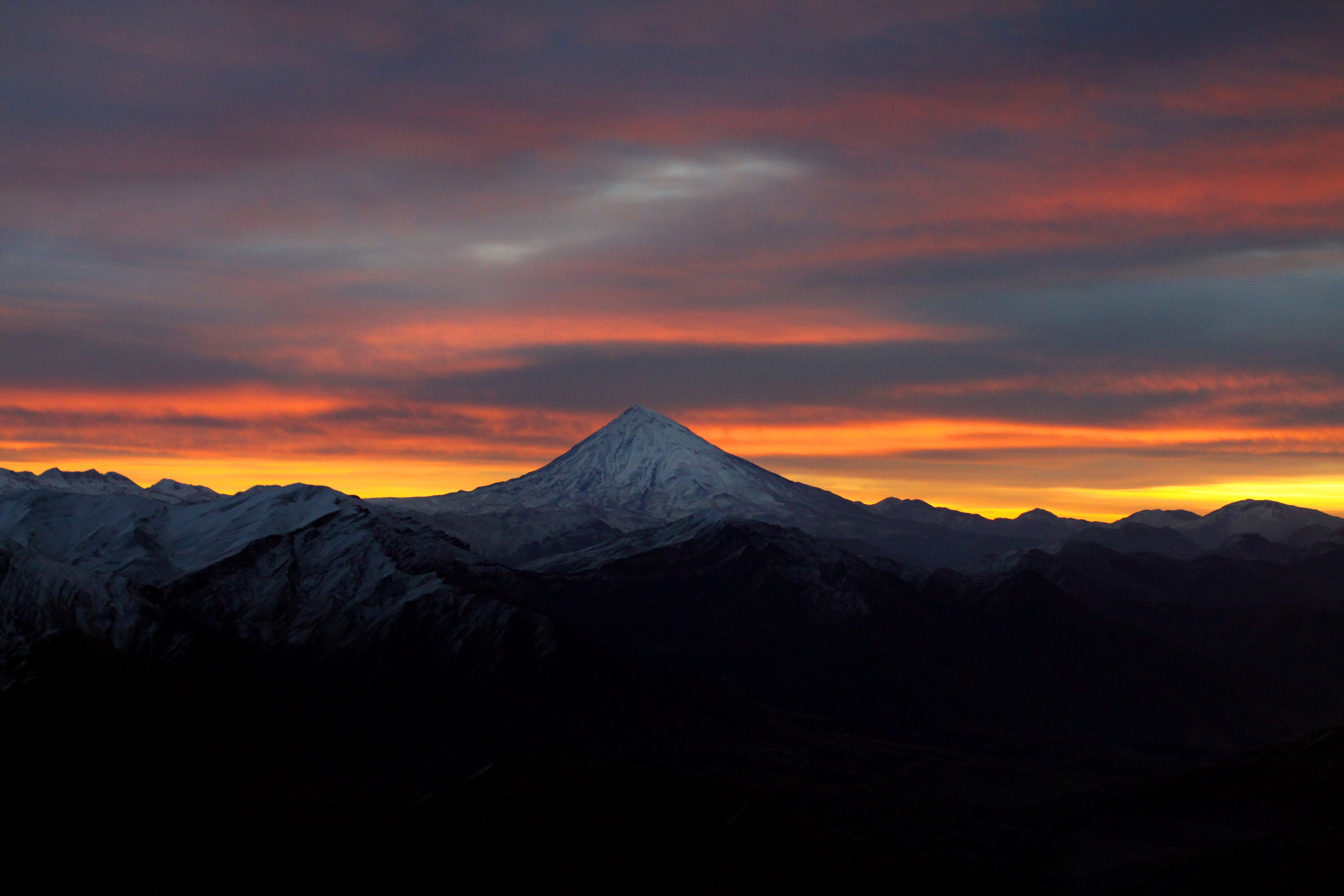
Damavand west side, view from Tochal summit

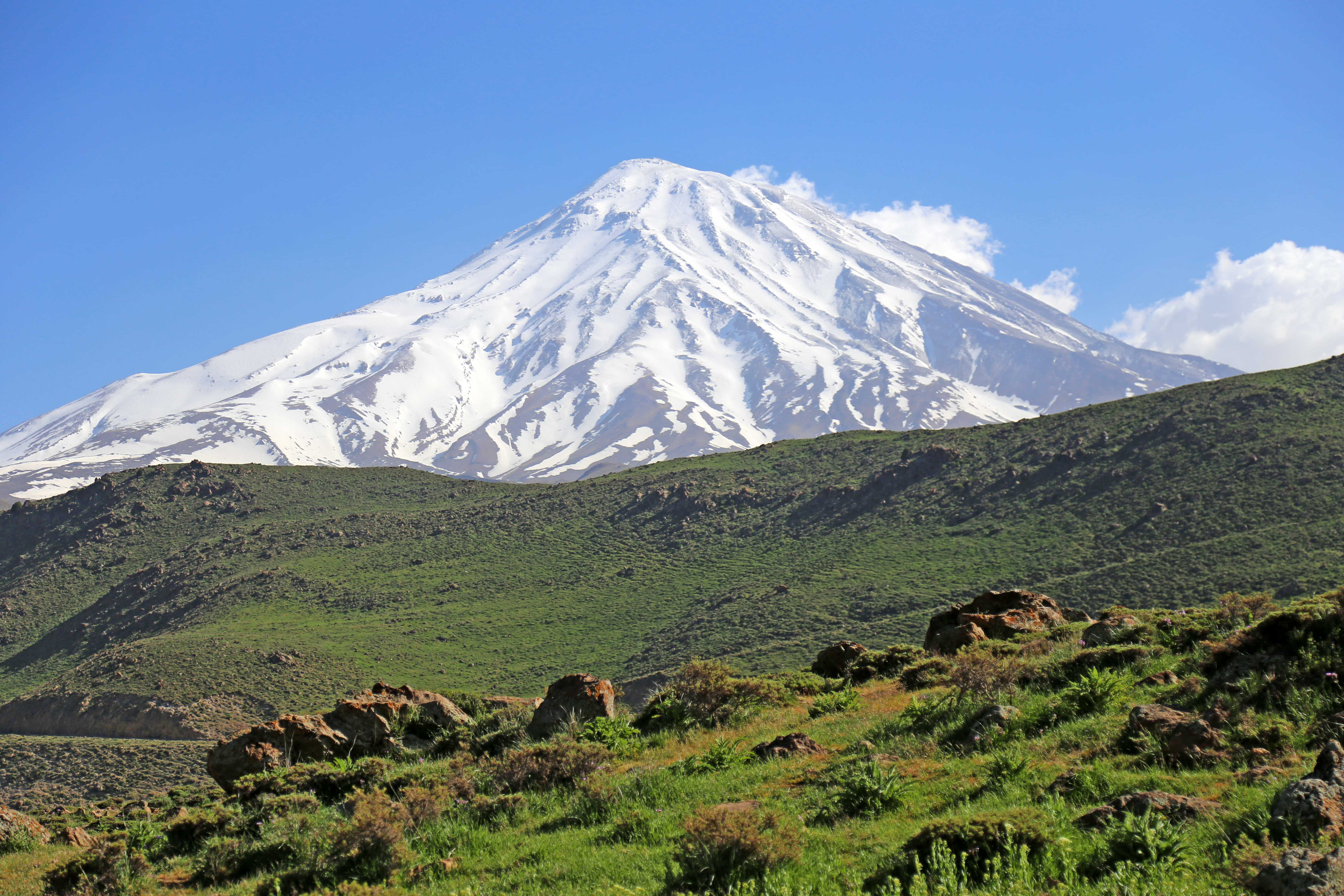
Mount Damavand from Polour Area

== See also ==
- Tirgan
- List of mountains in Iran
- List of peaks by prominence
- List of Ultras of West Asia
- List of volcanoes in Iran
- Lists of volcanoes
- Maranak
- Volcanic Seven Summits
