= Davidiella tassiana =

Scientific classification
- Domain: Eukaryota
- Kingdom: Fungi
- Division: Ascomycota
- Class: Dothideomycetes
- Order: Capnodiales
- Family: Davidiellaceae
- Genus: Davidiella
- Species: D. tassiana

Binomial name
- Davidiella tassiana (De Not.) Crous & U.Braun, (2003)

Synonyms
- Carlia tulasnei (Jancz.) Höhn., (1930); Cladosporium graminum Corda, (1824); Gnomonia schoenoprasi Ces. & De Not., (1863); Mycosphaerella schoenoprasi Rabenh., (1894) [1897]; Mycosphaerella tassiana (De Not.) Johanson, (1884); Mycosphaerella tulasnei (Jancz.) Lindau, (1903); Phaeosphaerella schoenoprasi (Ces. & De Not.) Petr., (1928); Sphaerella schoenoprasi Auersw., (1860); Sphaerella tassiana De Not., (1863); Sphaerella tulasnei Jancz., (1894); Vermicularia schoenoprasi Rabenh., (1862)

Species of fungus

Davidiella tassiana is a fungal plant pathogen infecting several hosts, including Iris barnumiae subsp. demawendica in Iran.

== Infected plant species ==
Davidiella tassiana has a wide range of host species. These include:

- Agrostis canina
- Agrostis stolonifera
- Anthoxanthum odoratum
- Arabis petraea
- Bistorta vivipara
- Carex bigelowii
- Carex capitata
- Draba incana
- Draba nivalis
- Deschampsia caespitosa
- Epilobium latifolium
- Galium normanii
- Gentianella amarella ssp. septentrionalis
- Hierochloe odorata
- Juncus alpinus
- Juncus articulatus
- Juncus triglumis
- Luzula arcuata
- Poa alpina
- Poa glauca
- Poa nemoralis
- Potentilla palustris
- Puccinellia distans
- Ranunculus glacialis
- Rhodiola rosea
- Saxifraga caespitosa
- Saxifraga hirculus
- Thalictrum alpinum
- Thymus praecox ssp. arcticus
