= Maranak =

Settlement in Iran

Coordinates: 35°41′N 52°02′E

Maranak is a village near the city of Damavand, Iran, located in Tehran. It is the site of an ancient Jewish cemetery. The original name of this place (including diacritics) is Marānak. In 2004, the village was the location of a program to teach young Iranian students about the Internet and other computer technologies.
