= Iris barnumiae subsp. demawendica =

Scientific classification
- Kingdom: Plantae
- Clade: Tracheophytes
- Clade: Angiosperms
- Clade: Monocots
- Order: Asparagales
- Family: Iridaceae
- Genus: Iris
- Species: I. barnumiae
- Subspecies: I. b. subsp. demawendica

Trinomial name
- Iris barnumiae subsp. demawendica (Bornm.) B.Mathew & Wendelbo

Synonyms
- Iris acutiloba var. demawendica Bornm.; Iris acutiloba subsp. demawendica (Bornm.) Bornm.; Iris demawendica (Bornm.) Dykes

Subspecies of flowering plant

Iris barnumiae subsp. demawendica (also spelled as demavendica) is a subspecies of Iris barnumiae. It is a rhizomatous perennial native to the Elburz Mountains in Iran. It was originally thought to be a separate species before going through various changes and being classed as a subspecies. It has erect, grey-green (grass-like) leaves and two large flowers, which come in shades from claret-red, burgundy, violet-blue, to dark purple, with a white or cream beard. It is rarely cultivated as an ornamental plant in temperate regions, due to the environmental conditions it prefers.

== Description ==
It is a geophyte, with small rhizomes and very short fibrous secondary roots. The roots do not multiply very quickly, to make clumps of plants. The leaves are erect, grass-like and grey green. They can grow up to 15 cm (6 in) long, and between 0.4 and 0.7 cm wide. After the blooms died, the leaves also die back. It has a slender stem or peduncle, that can grow up to 15 cm (6 in) tall. The stems hold 2 terminal (top of stem) flowers, which bloom between April, May, or June to July. The flowers are larger than Iris iberica, and come in shades from claret-red, burgundy, violet, violet-blue, to dark purple. Like other irises, it has 2 pairs of petals, 3 large sepals (outer petals), known as the 'falls' and 3 inner, smaller petals (or tepals), known as the 'standards'. The falls are larger, and wider than I. barnumiae. They have deep violet-red veins, and a narrow and sometimes unseen, darker signal patch. In the middle of the falls, is a narrow, row of short hairs called the 'beard', which is white, grey-white, or cream. The standards are paler than the falls. After the iris has flowered, it produces a seed capsule, which has not yet been described.

=== Biochemistry ===
As most irises are diploid, having two sets of chromosomes, this can be used to identify hybrids and classification of groupings. In 1977, 47 entities (under "species") of the irises in the Oncocyclus section were analysed, and found to have a chromosome count of 2n=20.

== Taxonomy ==
The Latin specific epithet demawendica refers to Mount Damavand in Iran, where the iris can be found.

It is sometimes referred to as demavendica.

On 4 June 1902, a specimen of the iris (labelled as I. demawendica), was collected from 'Persia borealis' (Northern Iran) by J. Bornmuller, and A. Bornmuller.

It was first published as Iris demawendica by Joseph Friedrich Nicolaus Bornmüller (1862–1948) in 1902. It was also published in Gardeners' Chronicle in 1906, Vol. 3339 (third Series) on page364. It was classified as being a member of the Cushion Iris group (an older name of the Oncocyclus section).

In 1908, it was re-assessed by Bornmuller and renamed as a variant of Iris acutiloba, it was published as Iris acutiloba var. demawendica in Bull. Herb. Boissier Vol.II, Edition 8 on page 727.

In 1912, it was re-assessed by Dykes and renamed Iris demawendica (Bornm.) Dykes in Gen. Iris on page 123.

In 1950, it was re-assessed by Karl Heinz Rechinger (based on a description by Bornmueller) and re-published as Iris acutiloba var. demawendica, in Ann. Naturhist. Mus. Wien lvii. page 68. and then with an illustration in Botanical Magazine Vol.448 in 1964.

It was then finally re-assessed and classed as I. barnumiae subsp. demawendica by B.Mathew and Wendelbo in 'Flora Iranica' (Fl. Iranica, with editor – Rechinger) Vol.112 on page 35 in 1975.

It is listed in the Encyclopedia of Life as 'Iris barnumiae subsp. demawendica', and in the Catalogue of Life.

It has not yet been assessed for the IUCN Red List as of June 2016.

== Distribution and habitat ==
It is native to Asia as an Irano-Turanian species.

=== Range ===
It is found in Iran, (or Persia,) within the Elburz Mountains, (or Alborz Mountains,). Between the Khandavan Pass, to Firouzkuh, including the Jahan Nama Protected Area.

=== Habitat ===
It grows on the rocky mountain slopes (of the Elburz Mountains).

They can be found at an altitude of 2,300–4,200 m (7,500–13,800 ft) above sea level.

== Cultivation ==
In 1903, a specimen of the species was given to Kew Botanical gardens, from Max Leichtlin, (from Baden-Baden, Germany).

Iris demawendica was listed for sale by Barr and Sons in 1904.

It is hardy (in UK), when planted in a south-facing border, at the base of a wall. In winter, it must not have its roots in water, as the frost will kill the rhizomes, also in summer, water around the roots provides host for viruses.

In Kandevan, Iran it has been found that Davidiella tassiana (de Not.) Crous & U. Braun and Pleospora chlamydospora Sacc. (two types of fungi) can be found on Iris barnumiae subsp. demawendica (Bornm.) Mathew & Wendelbo.

=== Propagation ===
Irises can generally be propagated by division, or by seed growing. Every three years, the clumps of irises are normally divided, as the plants are highly likely to get bacterial rot if they suffer any moisture or humidity. They are best re-planted in late September when temperatures are low and humidity is also low. This is also when the plants generate root and shoot growth. Irises generally require a period of cold, then a period of warmth and heat, also they need some moisture. Some seeds need stratification, (the cold treatment), which can be carried out indoors or outdoors. Seedlings are generally potted on (or transplanted) when they have 3 leaves.

== Toxicity ==
Like many other irises, most parts of the plant are poisonous (rhizome and leaves), and if mistakenly ingested can cause stomach pains and vomiting. Also, handling the plant may cause skin irritation or an allergic reaction.

== Culture ==
On 2 March 1991, Iran published a set of stamps called the 'Flora of Iran' collection, which included I. demawendica.
