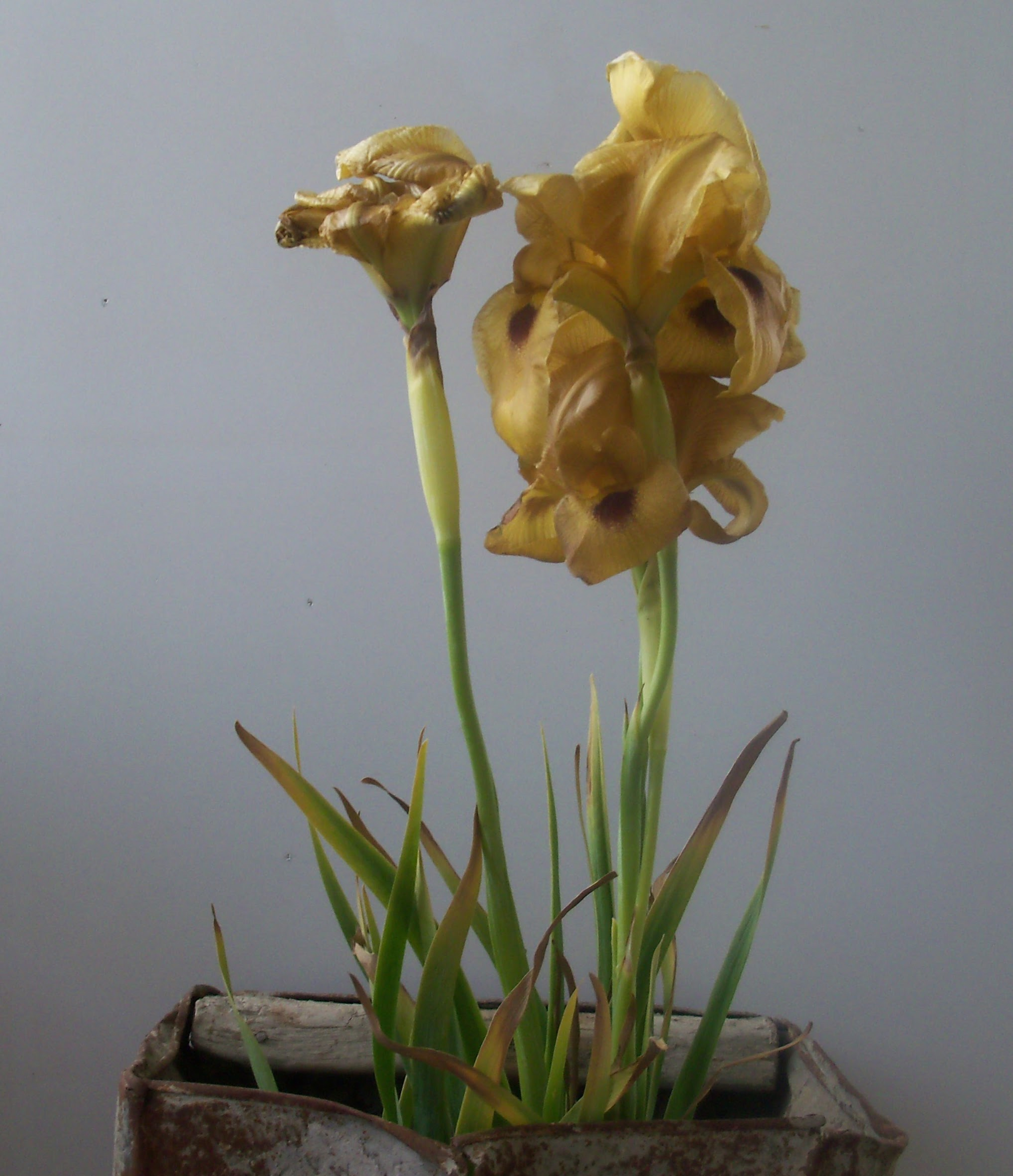

Conservation status
- Data Deficient (IUCN 3.1)

Scientific classification
- Kingdom: Plantae
- Clade: Embryophytes
- Clade: Tracheophytes
- Clade: Spermatophytes
- Clade: Angiosperms
- Clade: Monocots
- Order: Asparagales
- Family: Iridaceae
- Genus: Iris
- Subgenus: Iris subg. Iris
- Section: Iris sect. Oncocyclus
- Species: I. auranitica

Binomial name
- Iris auranitica Dinsm.

Synonyms
- Iris auranitica var. unicolor Mouterde; Iris auranitica f. wilkiana Chaudhary, G. Kirkw. & C. Weymouth

= Iris auranitica =

Species of plant

Iris auranitica is a species in the genus Iris, it is also in the subgenus Iris and in the section Oncocyclus. It is a rhizomatous perennial in the Jabal al-Druze region in Syria, where it grows at about 1600 m. It has thin and long, greyish-green, semi-evergreen leaves. In May, it has fragranced flowers (between light yellow to mustard), with a dark signal patch and yellow beard with purple tips. It is rarely cultivated as an ornamental plant in temperate regions, as it needs very dry conditions during the summer.

== Description ==
It is a geophyte, which has small rhizomes, that are on the surface of the soil, so that they can feel the heat of the sun. Under the rhizome, they have extremely long secondary roots.

It has greyish-green, semi-evergreen leaves, which are thin and can grow up to between 10–20 cm (4–8 in) long. The rhizomes and leaves form small clumps of plants.

It has a slender stem or peduncle, that can grow up to 50 cm (20 in) tall.

The stems hold terminal (top of stem) flowers, blooming in mid-season, or spring, in May. In cultivation, they flower as late as June. The fragranced flowers, come in shades of yellow, from light yellow to mustard, or bronze, and gold. In the wild, there is a great deal of variety in flower colour. Like other irises, it has 2 pairs of petals, 3 large sepals (outer petals), known as the 'falls' and 3 inner, smaller petals (or tepals), known as the 'standards'. The falls are orbiculate (or circular) or pendulum shaped, with a maroon or reddish, signal patch, and red, or brown veining. They also have brown spots. In the middle of the falls, is a dense, row of short hairs called the 'beard', which is dark yellow, or bright yellow with purple red tips. It has similar coloured standards that do not have dots or veins.

After the iris has flowered, it produces a seed capsule, which has not yet been described.

=== Biochemistry ===
A study was carried out in 2013, to find out what oils are contained in the rhizomes of various irises in Syria, including Iris germanica, Iris barnumiae, Iris bostrensis and in I. auranitica. It found myristic acid, lauric acid, decanoic acid (capric acid), palmitic acid and methyl ester.

As most irises are diploid, having two sets of chromosomes, this can be used to identify hybrids and classification of groupings. It was counted in 1952, by Marc Simonet and then by Awishai & Zohary in 1980, as 2n = 20.

== Taxonomy ==
The Latin specific epithet auranitica refers to resembling an orange or orange-coloured. Also 'Auranitis' is an alternative to Hauran, Syria, where the iris is found.

It is sometimes misspelt as Iris aurantica.

It was first discovered by John Edward Dinsmore, in Tell Quleib (a hill near As-Suwayda,) in Syria, then he published and described the iris in 'Flora Syria' edition 2 (Palest. & Sinai) on page 601 in 1933.

Then again in Nat. Sc. Ser. No. 1; Publ. Am. Univ. Beirut, No.3, 1934, and in Gardening Illustrated 56 on page 389 on 30 June 1934.

It was verified by United States Department of Agriculture and the Agricultural Research Service on 4 April 2003, then updated on 1 December 2004.

== Distribution and habitat ==
It is native to temperate Asia.

=== Range ===
It is found in southern Syria, including Jab. Kulavb, and El Hauran.

It is listed as endemic plant of Syria, along with 200 other vascular plants including Iris assadiana (another Oncoyclus section iris), Teucrium coniortodes, Allium pseudophanerantherum, Allium birkinshawii, Ajuga chasmophila, Echium pabotii, Astragalus qatmensis, Astragalus roessleri, Centaurea trachonitica, Salsola zenobiae, Senecio delbesianus, Thymus alfredae, Vicia kalakhensis, Onobrychis gaillardotii, and Alyssum antilibanoticum.

=== Habitat ===
It grows on volcanic lava, and dry rocky soils.

== Conservation ==
It is a very rare iris, under threat of extinction.

== Cultivation ==
It is hardy to European Zone H4, meaning hardy to −5 to −10 °C (23 to 14 °F).

It is difficult to cultivate unless it has a hot and dry summer conditions.

=== Propagation ===
Irises can generally be propagated by division, or by seed growing. Irises generally require a period of cold, then a period of warmth and heat, also they need some moisture. Some seeds need stratification, (the cold treatment), which can be carried out indoors or outdoors. Seedlings are generally potted on (or transplanted) when they have 3 leaves.

=== Hybrids and cultivars ===
Ii has various cultivars including 'Unicolor' and 'Wilkiana'.

== Toxicity ==
Like many other irises, most parts of the plant are poisonous (rhizome and leaves), and if mistakenly ingested can cause stomach pains and vomiting. Also, handling the plant may cause skin irritation or an allergic reaction.

== Sources ==
- Chaudhary, et al. in Botaniska Notiser, vol. 128: p. 404, 1975.
- Journal of The Royal Horticultural Society. 61: 7, 291. July 1936
- Mathew, B. The Iris. 1981 (Iris) 45.
