= Amol =

City in Mazandaran province, Iran

Amol آمل Ancient names: Amerdad, Ameld, Amui, Ameleh, Amol
- City
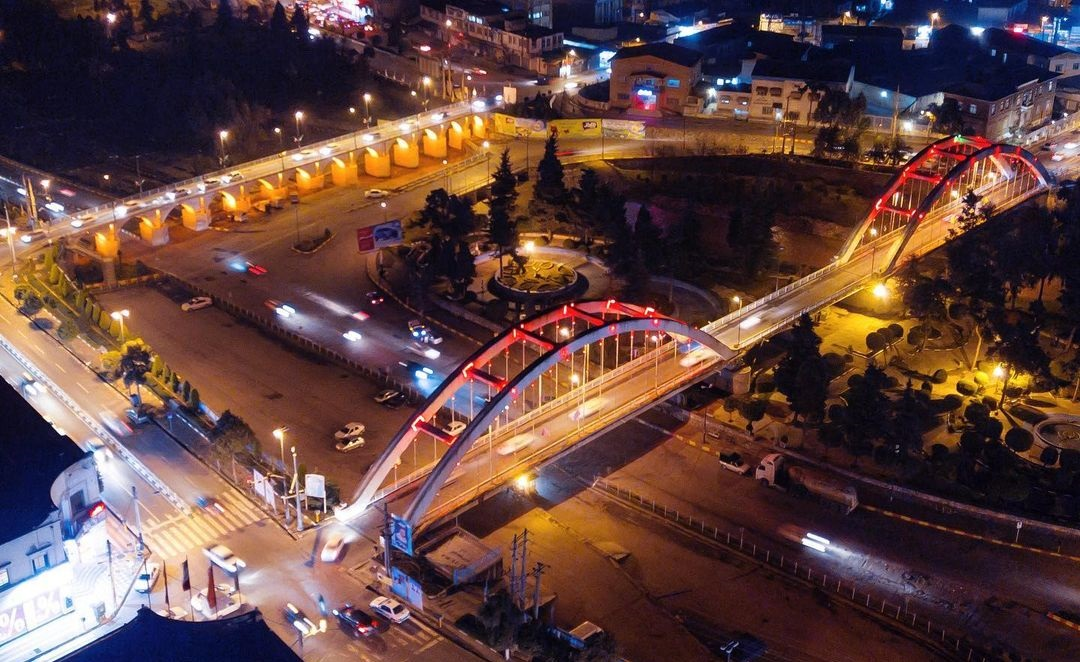
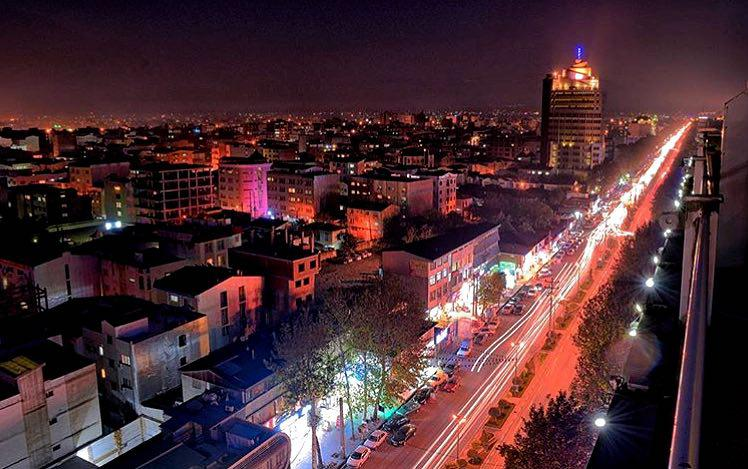
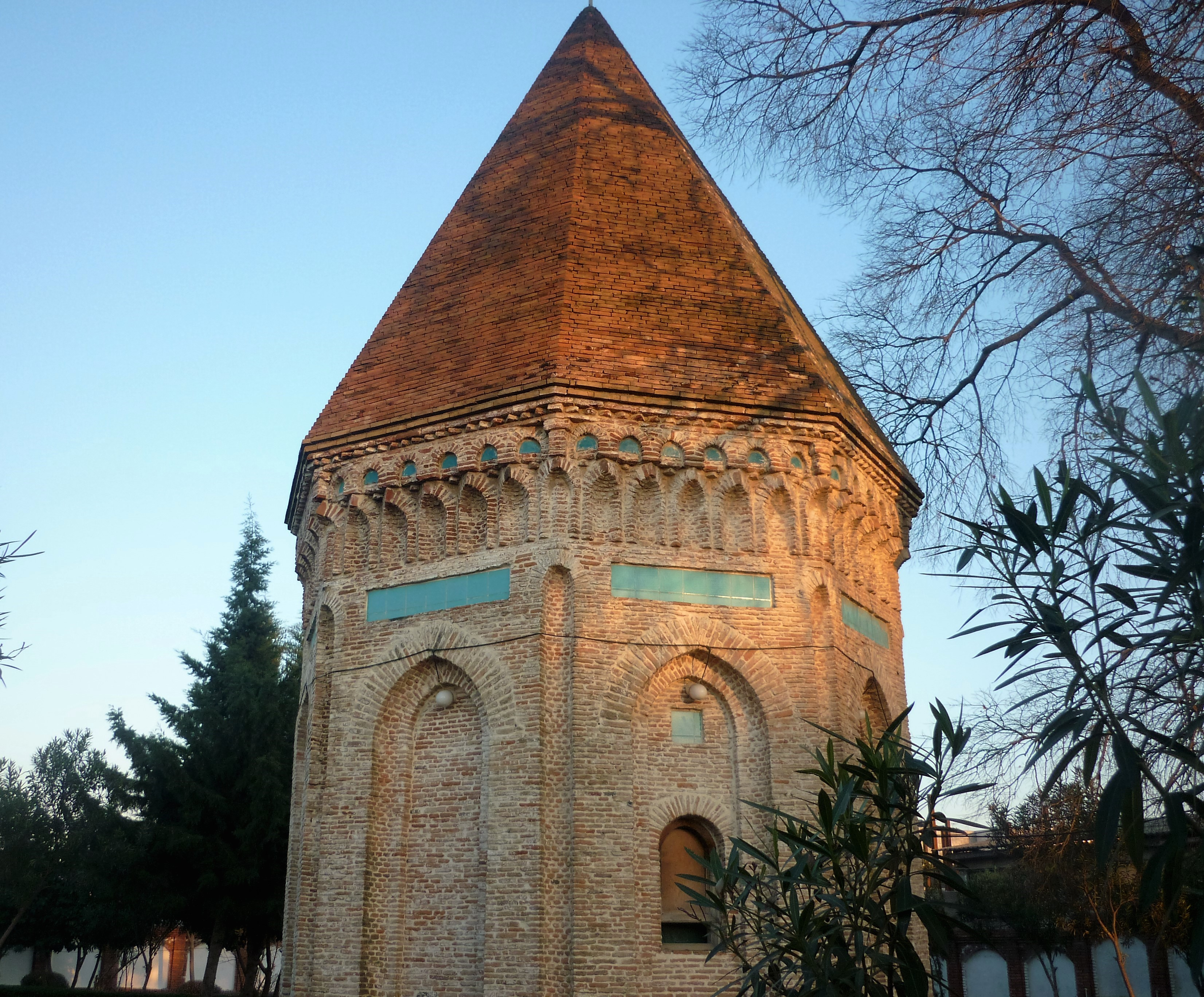
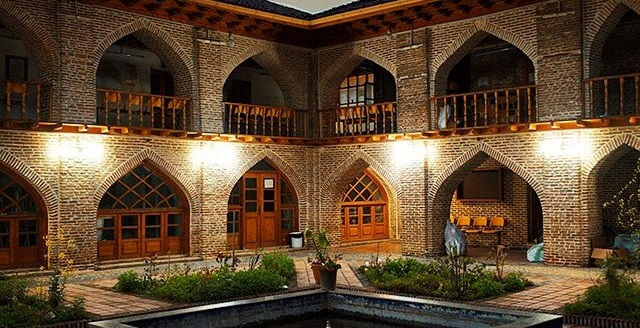
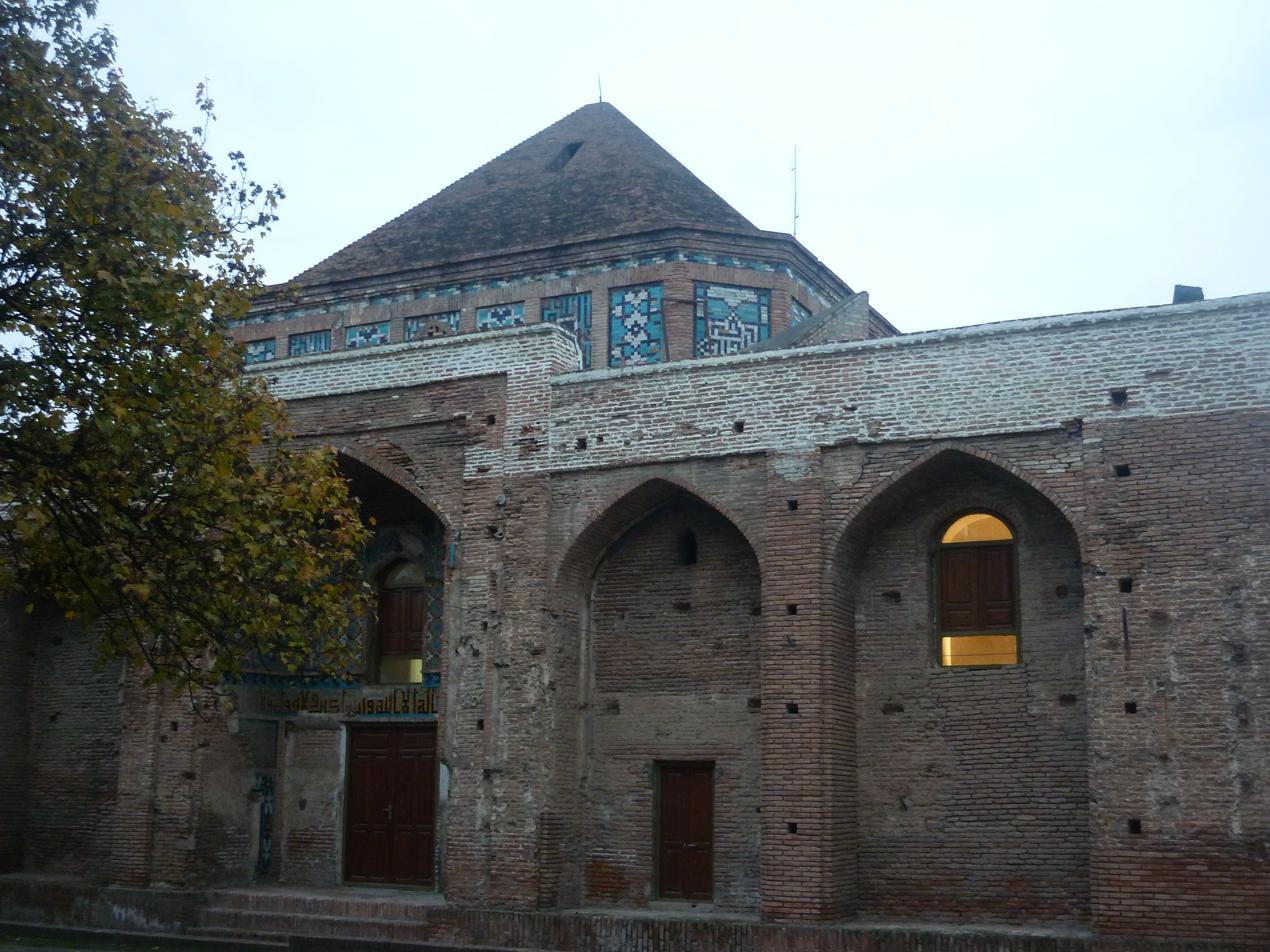
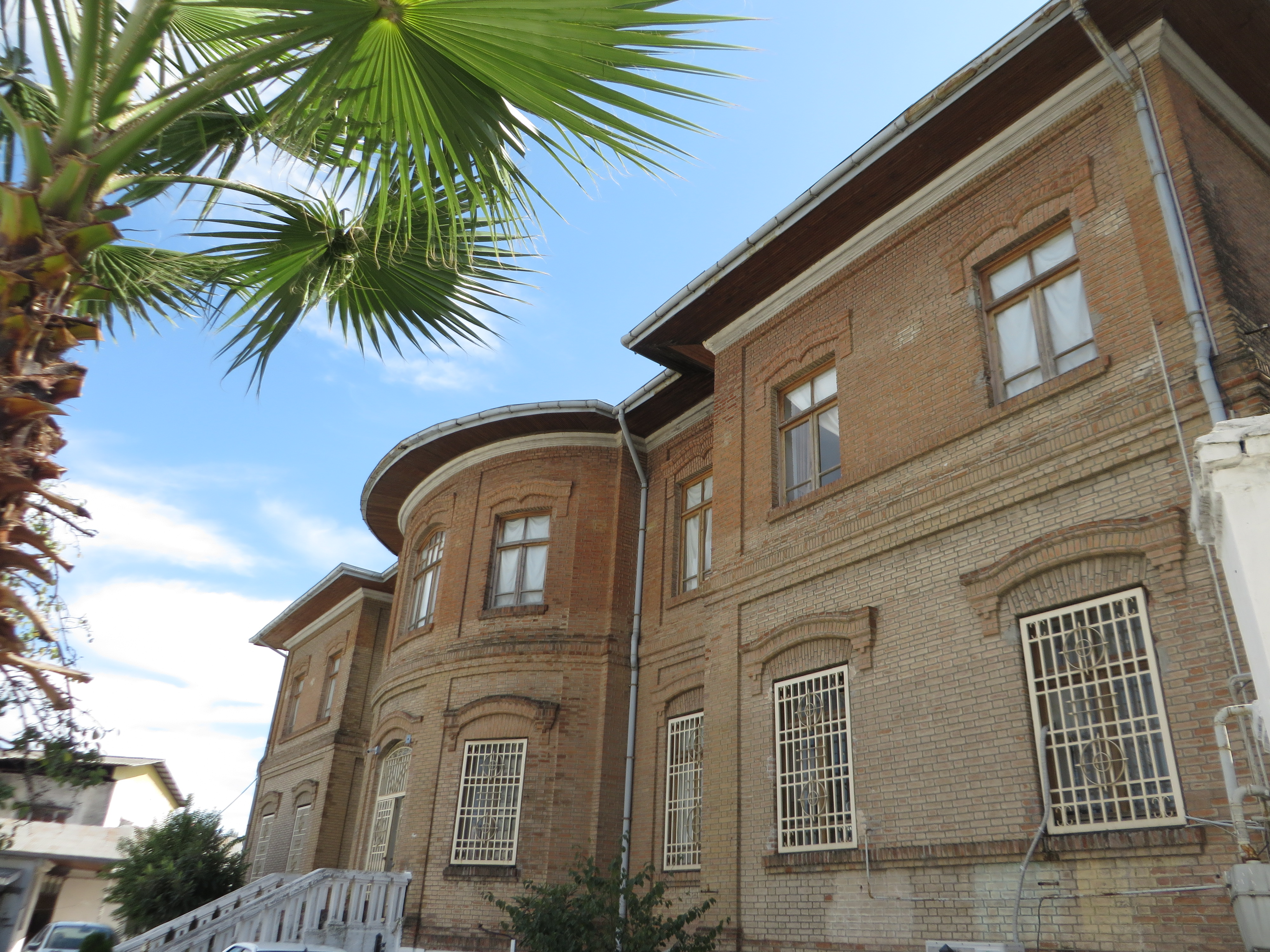
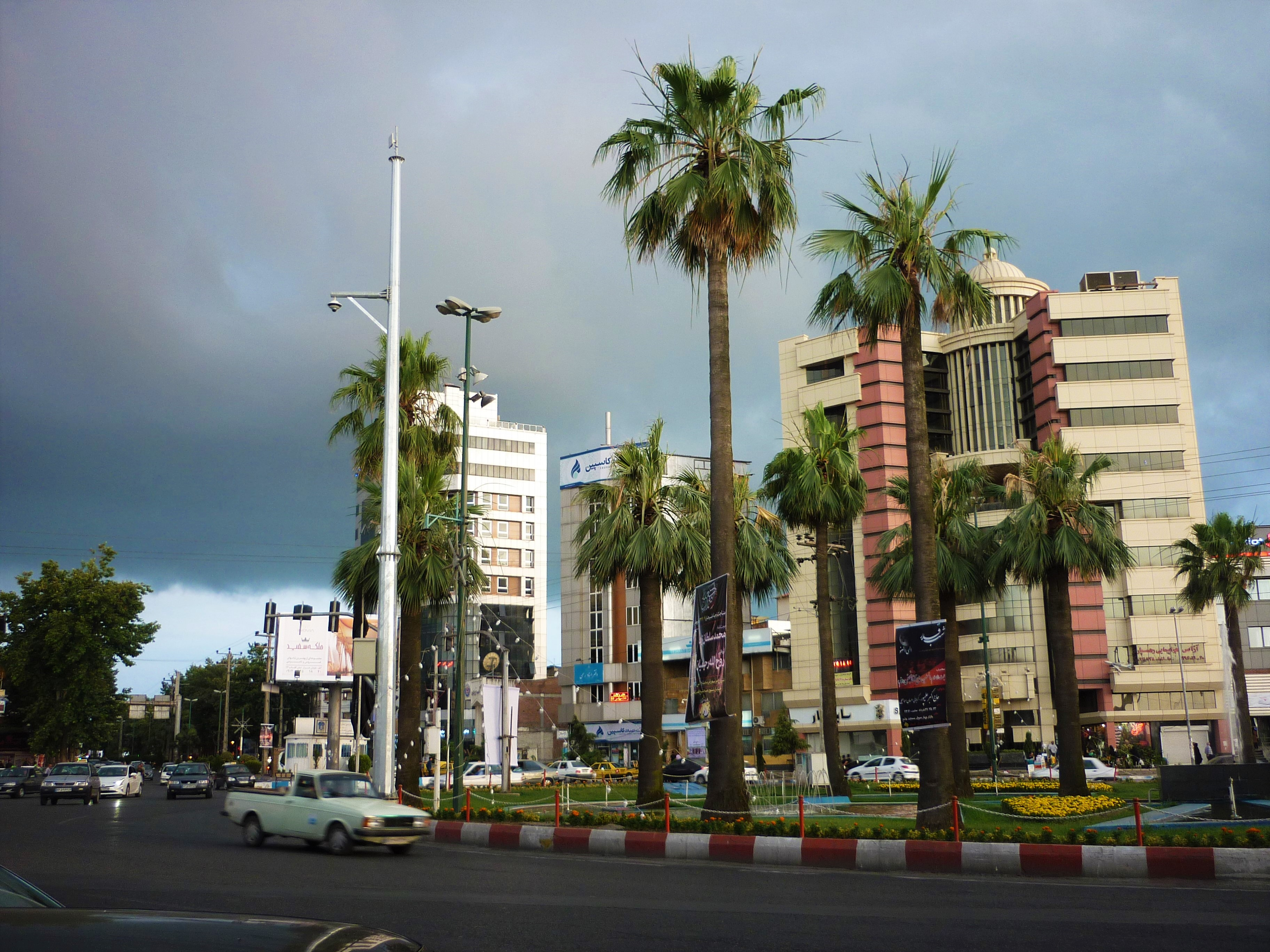
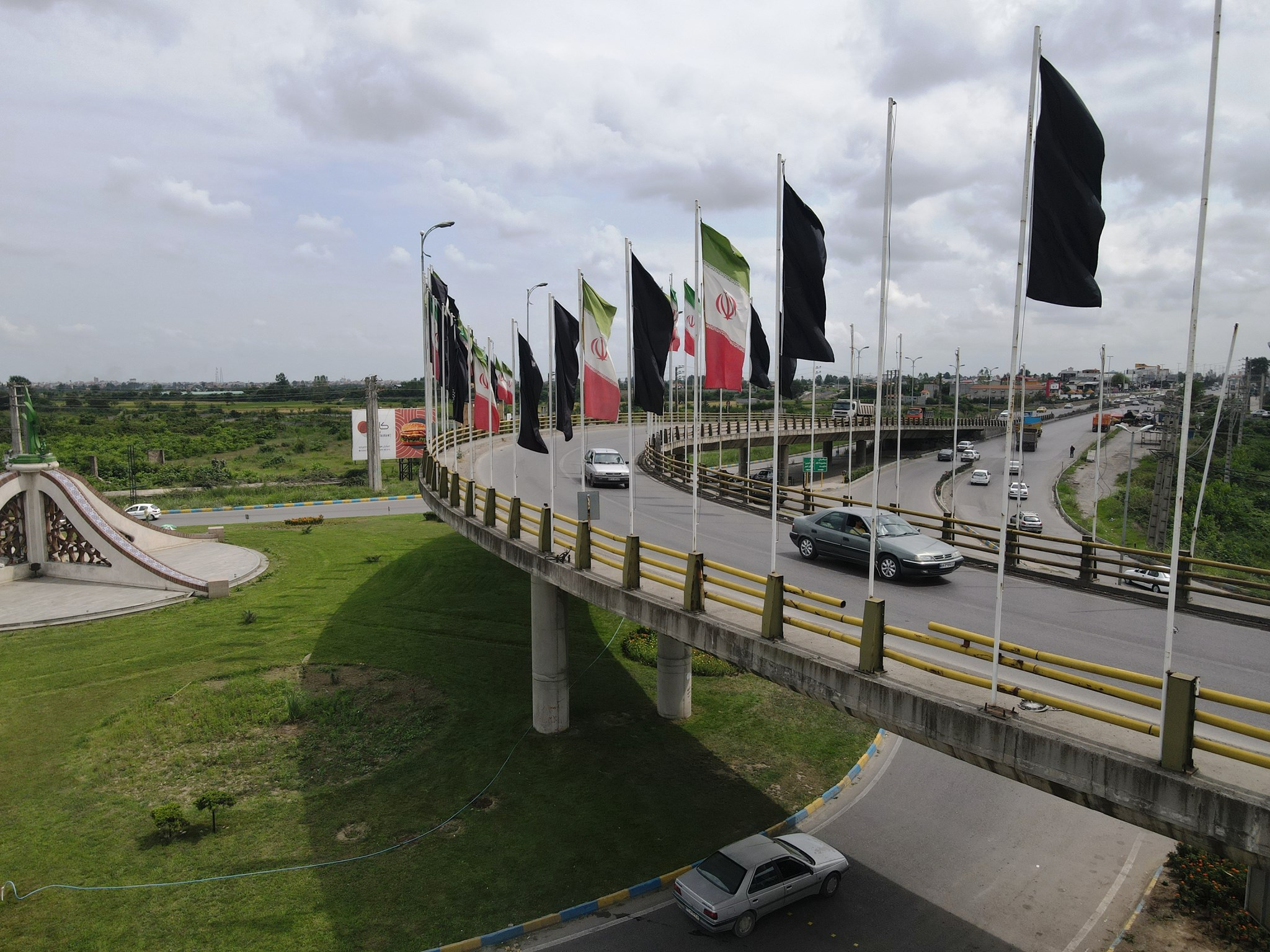

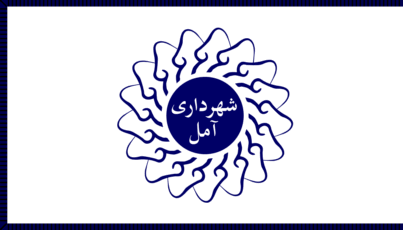
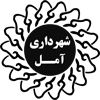
- Flag Seal

- Location within Iran
- Coordinates: 36°28′13″N 52°20′48″E
- Country: Iran
- Province: Mazandaran
- County: Amol
- District: Central
- Incorporated (city): 1922

Government
  - Mayor: Ali Davoudi

Area
  - City: 21 km^{2} (8.1 sq mi)
- Elevation: 76 m (249 ft)

Population (2016 census)
  - Urban: 237,528
  - Metro: 430,000
- Time zone: UTC+3:30 (IRST)
- Postal code: 46131–46391
- Area code: (+98) 11
- Vehicle Plate: IRAN ب72, د82 ,ق82 , ب92
- Website: amol.ir amol.gov.ir amoltourism.ir

Amol (Persian: آمل [ɒˈmol];) (Note: Also romanized as Āmol; also known as Amul) is a city in the Central District of Amol County, Mazandaran province, Iran, serving as capital of both the county and the district.

Amol is located on the Haraz River bank. It is situated less than 20 kilometres (12 mi) south of the Caspian Sea and less than 10 kilometres (6.2 mi) north of the Alborz mountains. It is 124 kilometres (77 mi) northeast of Tehran, and 60 kilometres (37 mi) west of the provincial capital, Sari. It is one of the oldest cities in Iran, and a historic city, with its foundation dating back to the Amardi tribe, who inhabited the region in the Iron Age. Amol is the center of industry and culture of Mazandaran, the rice capital of Iran, and one of the most important cities of the transportation, agriculture, and tourism industries in Iran. It is known as the History, Science and Philosophy city, City that does not die and Hezar Sangar city.

== History ==
=== Pre-Islamic era ===
According to the city government, the name is derived from Amardi, a tribe mentioned by the Roman historian Ammianus Marcellinus.

Amol is one of the most ancient cities of Iran. A number of historians and geographers believe it was established in the 1st millennium BC. Some historians have attributed the birth of the city during the reign of the mythological king Tahmuras.

==== Pishdadian and Amard ====
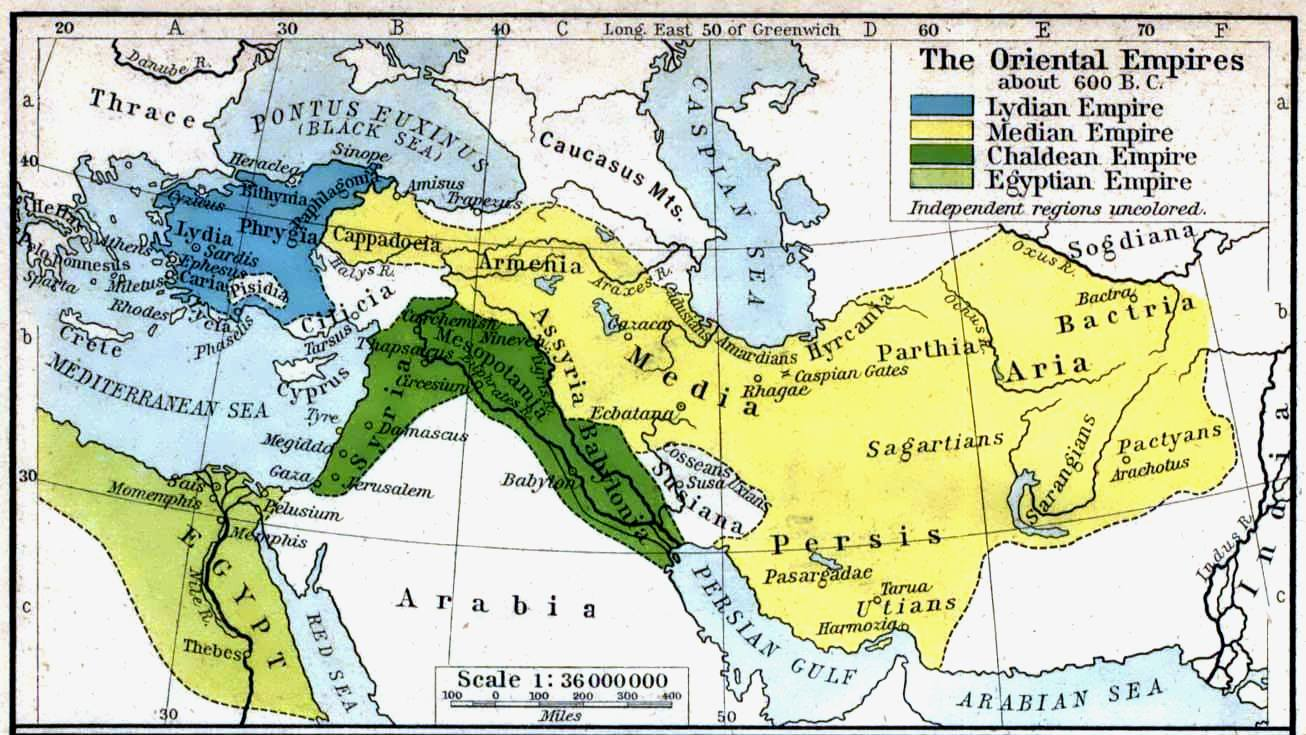
Map of the Median Empire (600 BC) showing the relative locations of the Amardian tribe

Some historians have associated this ancient city with the periods of the Pishdadian dynasty and the Kayanian dynasty. The people inhabiting the area before the arrival of Aryans, were known as Amards (Amui in Pahlavi), who had migrated to and settled on the Iranian Plateau between the late 2nd millennium BC and early 1st millennium BC. According to historical literature, Amol was the capital of Mazandaran, at least in the period starting from Sassanid Empire to the Ilkhanate dynasty of Mongol Empire. Though they are a Median tribe, Herodotus named the tribe Mardians as one of the ten to fifteen Persian tribes in Persis. It is now known that the only distinction between the Median Amardians and the Persian Mardians is the 'a' at the beginning of Amardians, which would mean they are two different tribes. Elsewhere, he says, one of the peoples who have trusted Darius I

Igor M. Diakonoff says that Amardians lived on the coasts of the Caspian Sea, in the distance of the Alban and Otia from the north and the Hyrcanian from the east.

Strabo says about the Tapyri that they wore black robes and had long hair, and "he who is adjudged the bravest marries whomever he wishes" (Geography 11.8 = T520a). In the history of the Persian Empire, the Mard were handsome, capable, and brave persons present in the heart of the army and were responsible for defending the commander.) The Amard helped the Achaemenid in several battles, including the invasion of Greece, the occupation of Sardis, the attack of the Medes, and at the Battle of Opis. Ibn Isfandiyar has another theory about Amol which says, at the request of his wife, Firoz Shah created a large and flourishing city named Amele.

==== Achaemenid Empire ====
People of Amol were p, the current Caspian Sea. Further evidence of the power of the Amol people is their fighting in the Battle of Thermopylae, Battle of Gaugamela and other Sardis forces in the Achaemenid Empire. Quintus Curtius Rufus said, Immortals (Achaemenid Empire) Archers they were all Amard people.

==== Parthian Empire ====
During the reign of the Parthian Empire, Amol was one of the centers of Iran. It seems that Amol's reputation in the time of Alexander the Great and the Parthian period dominated the political-administrative Satrap was Hyrcanian. During the Parthian period, Amol was also famous and prosperous, which was called Homo or Hamo. Parthian King Phraates I (171–173 AH) defeated the Mardas in the Amol region. He is said to have moved a group of people to the Parthian lands in northern Khorasan and settled in western Amu Darya, also known as Amol Zam.

==== Sasanian Empire ====
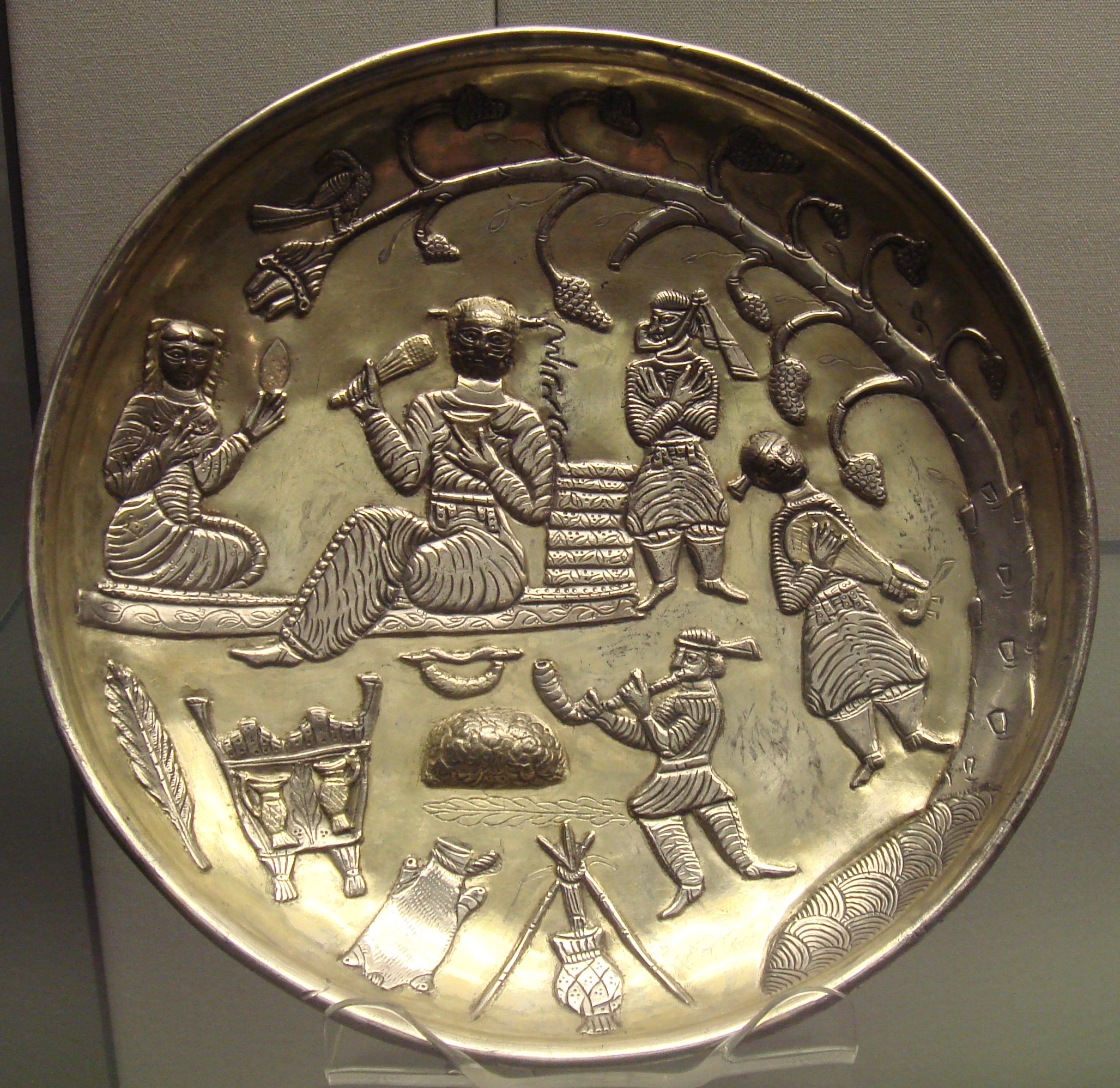
Silver gilt dish of Tapuria, 7th–8th centuries. A tradition initiated under the Sasanians and continued after the Arab invasions. Anuzhad inscription in Pahlavi script, next to the reclining figure. British Museum

According to historical literature, Amol was the capital of Mazandaran during the period starting from the 3rd century AD under the Sasanian Empire to the 13/14th century AD under the Ilkhanate dynasty of Mongol Empire. Before Islam, Amol was one of the largest and most important cities in the region and was considered the center of Mazandaran. The city of Amol existed before the Sassanids and during Alexander's time. During the Sassanid era, the importance of this Amol was increased due to the escape of the followers of Mazdak to this city. Based on pieces of evidence, including the coins found during excavations in addition to Muslim historical books, Amol was the capital of Mazandaran province during the Sassanid era. On Sasanian coins, coin cities where there has been an abbreviated name is known, but the mark m was Amol. During the Bahram V, Amol was Central to Iran and during the Khosrow II and Dabuyid dynasty capital Mazandaran. Amu Darya The Sasanian Pers River is about 2,500 km long, regarded in ancient times as the boundary between Iran and Turan; the modern name may be derived from Amol. In the city during this period, there was a Temple, Market, and fireplace there was. Ibn Rawi, in his book, calls Amol bigger than Isfahan and Qazvin.

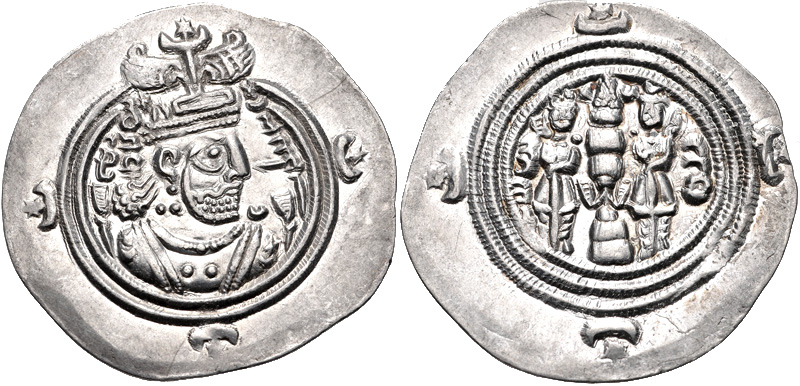
Coin of Khosrow II, minted in Amol

Hudud al-'Alam had said about Amol, that it was a great city with most moats and castles, the universe and the origin of merchants, and city Carpet, mats, boxwood, bowls, brick, and medallions are found.

Herodotus in Histories, mentions the tribes of the Tabaristan, the Mard or the Amards In the time of the king Darius the Great from influential and tribespeople. During the Sassanid era, the city of Amol enjoyed development and was the center of the important province of Tabarestan. During this period, the city had infrastructures and elements such as government citadels, neighborhoods, fire temples, and bazaars and a fire temple in the area, called Avam Kuye.

Dabuyid dynasty and Bavand dynasty Iranian dynasty were the kings of the Sassanid dynasty; they lived in Amol, which was the city capital of these dynasties. The coins of Ispahbudhan of Tabarestan and the Arab and Sassanid eras have been minted in Amol mint and sometimes in Sari. It can be argued that the mints of several cities in Mazandaran, especially Amol and Sari, such as the city of Gorgan, have been engaged in minting various coins for 1,300 years.

=== Islamic era ===
==== Abbasid, Alid, Ziyarid, Marashis ====
Amol, in the era of the Alid dynasties and Marashis dynasty, was the capital of Northern Iran. The inhabitants of Amol embraced Islam during the reign of Mahdi (775–785), the Abbasid Caliph. Amol was also the capital city of the Bavand dynasty and Ziyarid dynasty. The people of Amol initially resisted the Arabs. In the Abbasid Caliphate of the ninth century, Amol was one of the largest cities in Iran. Khalid ibn Barmak built a palace in the city and ruled for years. People from the Qarinvand dynasty arrived a couple of years ago and fought with the Abbasid Caliphate to win the kingdom. During the Umayyad Caliphate period, during the reign of Muawiyah I, Sa'id ibn al-As undertook the conquest of Tabaristan, and with an army of 4,000 troops rushed there, and the whole war between him and Farrukhan the Great lasted for two whole years, but was postponed. The conflict lasted until Abbasid Caliphate until the attack of the Persian general Wandad Hurmuzd.

In Hudud al-'Alam, Amol is regarded as a great city with active commerce and trading ventures. However, resentment with the Tahirids rule increased due to the oppressive activities of their officials. People of the provinces pledged alliance to Hasan ibn Zayd. Zayd became the founder of the Zaydid dynasty of Tabaristan Alavids government in Tabaristan established and it's with Amol centered and 106-year domination of the Abbasids in the territory ended. Yaqub ibn Layth the was geostrategy in Amol. Hasan al-Utrush with a trip to Amol who re-established Zaydid rule over the province Tabaristan in northern Iran in 914, after fourteen years of Samanid rule. After the Alid dynasty, the Ziyarid dynasty ruled Iran and Tabaristan. At this time Amol was developed in such a way that geographers have written articles about the industry and its silk. Hasan ibn Zayd, nicknamed al-Dai al-Kabir, appeared in the Tabaristan region in 250 AH, and many dissatisfied people and the captives of the Caliph Tahirid strengthened him. He invited people and published the Shiite religion. After coming to power in Tabaristan, Daei Kabir moved his capital from Sari to Amol, which was Taherian's seat. In 260 A.D., Ya'qub ibn al-Layth al-Saffar marched on Tabaristan and entered Amol after the departure of Hassan ibn Zayd, but his rule did not last long and the Alavids recaptured the city again. The Alawites ruled the city until Ziyarid and Buyid, who were the handmaidens of the Shiites. The people of Amol were very militant and stood up to the Arabs, but social injustice and class divisions led the people to convert to Islam.

Qabus was in 1012 overthrown by his own army and was succeeded by his son Manuchihr, who quickly recognized the sovereignty of Mahmud of Ghazni and married one of his daughters. Manuchihr died in 1031 and was succeeded by his son Anushirvan Sharaf al-Ma'ali, whom Mahmud of Ghazni had chosen as the heir of the Ziyarid dynasty. From 1032 to 1040, the real power behind the throne was held by Abu Kalijar ibn Vayhan, a relative of Anushirvan Sharaf al-Ma'ali. During this period, Amol was chosen as the capital of Iran until 1090. He also had the first seminary by Hasan al-Utrush built in Amol, which was later named Imam Hassan Askari Mosque. The subsequent Afrasiyab dynasty flourished in the late medieval, pre-Safavid period; it is also called the Kia dynasty. It was founded by Kiya Afrasiyab, who conquered the Bavand kingdom in 1349 and made himself king of the region, in Amol. In this period Sheikh Khalifa Mazandarani of Amol was a leader Sarbadars. During the ministry of Nizam al-Mulk in the Seljuq Empire, Amol and other big cities of that time such as Nishapur, Balkh, Herat, Baghdad and Isfahan had a prestigious Nizamiyya.

==== Safavid era ====
In the time of the Safavid rulers of Mazandaran, Amol experienced a period of growth. The city was the favorite dwelling of Abbas II of Persia, who often frequented it. At the time Amol was considered "the capital of the inhabited world" and acclaimed for its grandeur. Several bridges were built in the area across the Haraz River at this time. During the Safavid era, especially during the reign of Abbas the Great, Mazandaran was considered and a road from Astarabad and Sari to Amol was built.

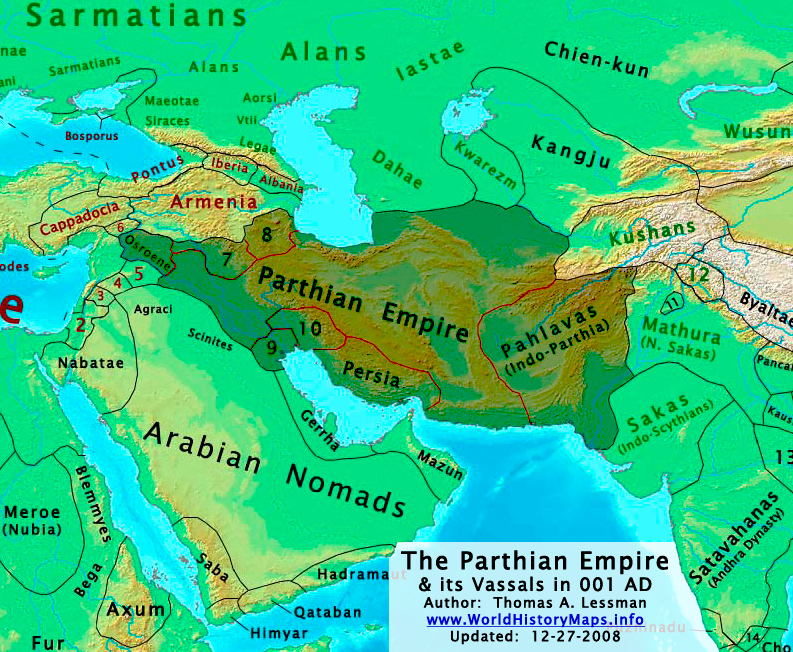
The extent of the Parthian Empire (shaded territory)

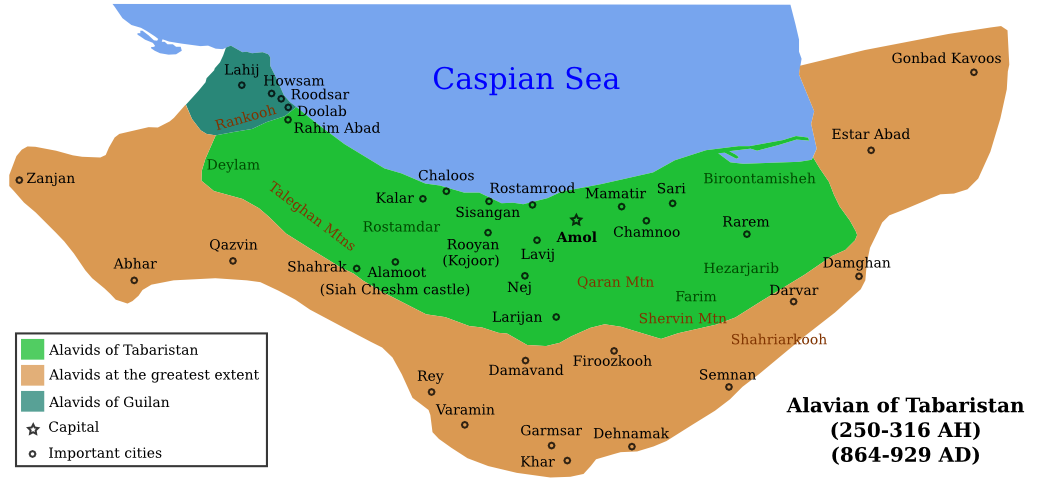
Map of the Alavid emirate with Amol as their capital

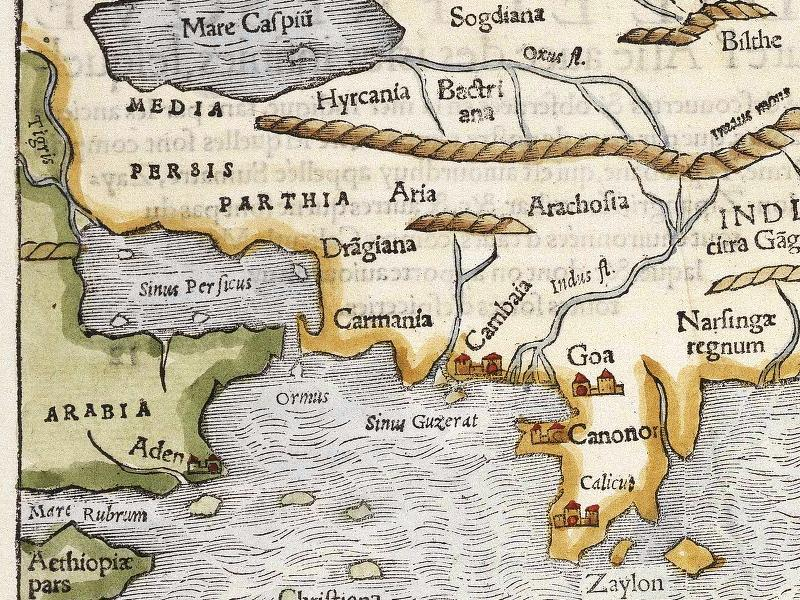
Latin (1689): Sea Amard

in town was founded through trade center position and business centers already exceeded and founded artillery. The town has spacious and well-supplied bazaars and post and telegraph offices. Excavations in Amol at Hall of Fame have uncovered glazed ceramic and glass belonging to Islamic and modern periods But after the Mongol invasion, the region was subject to devastation and it was during this time that Sari was declared as capital. At the beginning of the 7th century, Hessamedin Ardeshir shifted the capital from Sari to Amol and constructed his palace there. At this time, a Palace and Ab Anbar were built by order of Shah Abbas, and the tomb of Mir Ghavam al-Din (Mir Bozorg), which had been destroyed by Timur's agents, was magnificently rebuilt. Amol recovered a certain measure of prosperity while ruled by the Marashians and the Safavids. Under the latter, it was a center of the province of Mazandaran. Since then, it has never played a leading part in Persian national affairs, being surpassed in population by Babol and by the administrative capital of the province Sari; it has also suffered at various times from earthquakes. In continuation, Haraz River crosses the city of coal and iron mining region of Amol much iron can also have it in the past.

==== Afsharid and Zand eras ====
During the Afsharid era and later under the Zand dynasty, Amol was a city for trade and construction were instruments of war. During Nader Shah's reign in town was founded Iron plant through the trade center position to make cannonballs, mortars, and horseshoes, and business centers already exceeded and founded artillery. This was the first artillery workshop in Iran Jonas Hanway came to Iran at this time and visited Amol and talked about this city, Due to the abundance of iron ore mines, by Nader Shah's order, it became the most important foundry and steel plant, where cannonballs, rifles, and horseshoes were produced. Nader Shah eventually decided to build the Iranian Navy in Amol. At first, the people and rulers of Larijan and Amol, in support of Zand dynasty, resisted Agha Mohammad Khan Qajar and defeated him.

==== Qajar era ====
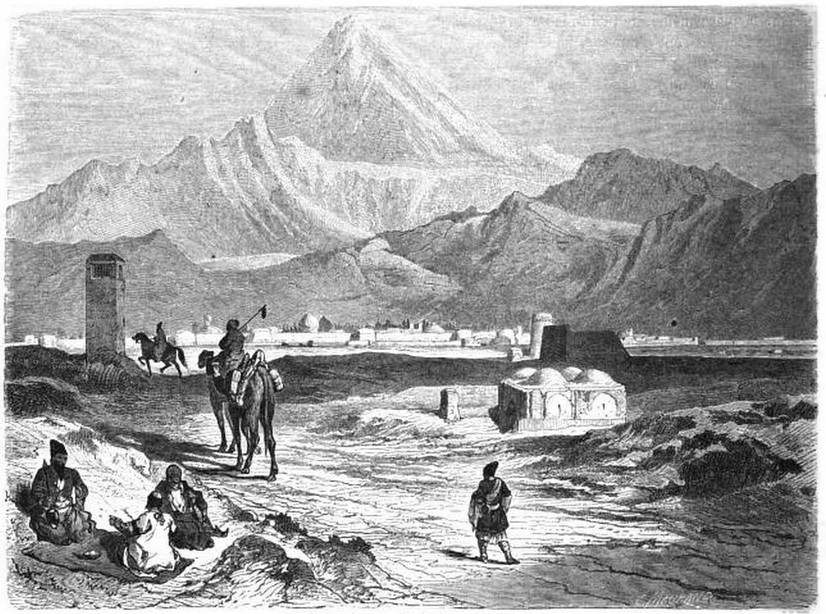
Merchants and travelers under Damavand mountain by Jules Laurens on July 1, 1859

In the Qajar era, the road and railway from Tehran to Amol, Amol was pulled from Mahmoudabad. Ibn Hawqal says the geographers of the 4th to 10th century describe Amol's great prosperity and prosperity; in the latter respect, according to Ebn Ḥawqal, it surpassed Qazvin. Its inner city was protected by a moat, and the houses were constructed of wood and reeds rather than mud bricks on account of the heavy summer rainfall. Rice, fruits, and vegetables grew profusely, and the town was a center for the fabrication of wooden articles, textiles, and carpets, the silks being especially famous. Amol port on the Caspian was the little town named Ahlam or Ahlom. James George Frazer entered Iran in 1238 as a merchant and scientist and said about this city in his travelogue that the city was truly great and vast. People were decent and respectable inhabitants of the city. Several leaders of the Iranian constitutional revolutions of 1905 and 1911 hailed from Amol. Mulla Ali Kani, one Amoli people reformist who led the people, had a great role in the achievement of the goals of Iran's constitutional revolution. During this period, was built many homes in the city. Although today Amol has expanded greatly on both sides of the Haraz river, its functions are still the same as they were seventy or eighty years ago. The Amol cotton cleaning plant was built in 1906 by the Russians. Prior to that, two companies, Rosenblum and Osser, in one of Amol boroughs that is, Barforoush, were active. In the 19th century, Amol iron and iron goods were traded all over Iran and as far abroad as Baghdad, Mosul and Damascus. Today, the main industries are food processing factories rice, minor woodworking shops, and a few brickworks. Pierre Amédée Jaubert says the Dispatch ambassador Napoleon Royal court Fath-Ali Shah Qajar visited Amol and mentioned in his book about the Haraz River and the centralization of Steel workshops on its shores. Although today Amol has expanded greatly on both sides of the Haraz river, its functions are still the same as they were seventy or eighty years ago. Besides being one of the county centers of the province of Mazandaran, it is a busy commercial center. In the itinerary, the book says, that Amol is a magnificent city with four gates, although there is no gate installed, namely Darvaze Tehran or Larijan, Barforosh, Taliksar and Nur.

After the fall of the Mongols, the Marashians appeared in Mazandaran. In 760 AH, Mir Ghavam al-Din Marashi established the Marashis government. The Marashis uprising began in Amol. After gaining power, the Marashians soon occupied all the lands and areas around Mazandaran and expanded their territory from Gorgan to Qazvin and Isfahan.

In interval Persian Campaign, Community Tabaristan by Amir Movayed Savadkoohi, with the support of Influential men of Amol, was founded to oppose the British and the Russians. Vsevolod Starosselsky in Amol built a Headquarters for capturing other cities in Mazandaran. Mirza Kuchak Khan To deal with him, entered Amol through the port of Ahlam with Khan's Amol and left the city after a long involvement against Persian Cossack Brigade.

In this epoch, with the support of the Shah and the wealth of Amin al-Zarb, the first modern railway in the history of Iran was established in Amol. Twenty-one kilometers of railway linking Amol and the iron mines of Mahan Nour to the Caspian port of Mahmoudabad in the name of Naseriyah. In 1887, the project prompted Amin al Zarb after three visits to Europe, and the contract for the construction of the railway was signed with the British company Quzi and a Belgian company. At the end of the reign of Naser al-Din Shah Qajar, the railway was completed in 1891 but never used due to the involvement of local people and Russians. About 700,000 tomans were invested in the project. Following the development technocracy policies of Iran by Amin al zarab, was established the first Steel mill of Iran in Amol. In 1887, Amin al zarb obtained an exclusive permit from Naser al-Din Shah for 30 years to establish a smelter, and bought an eight-meter furnace with a production capacity of 15 tons of iron from France for 24 hours and settled in Amol.

==== 20th century ====
===== Pahlavi era, Islamic Republic of Iran =====
During the reign of Reza Shah Pahlavi, the face of the town was changed drastically. Schools and most of the streets and governmental buildings current Amol date from that era. During this period, by order of Reza Shah, Austrian and German engineers built Moalagh Bridge, a Municipal mansion, a Municipal hotel, Chaikhori palace, Pahlavi High School, an Asset building, and a Rice warehouse for export. During this period, the construction of an alternative Haraz road was handed over to the Russian company Treskiniski by the Reza Shah.

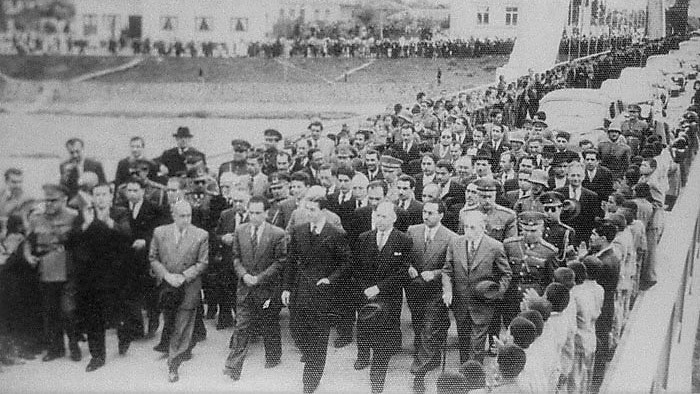
Mohammad Reza Shah Pahlavi in Amol, 1948

Hyacinth Louis Rabino, while visiting Amol during this period, described it as an open town with four gates, nine quarters, and approximately 2000 houses. A large bazaar contained about 400 shops with many traditional crafts and trades.

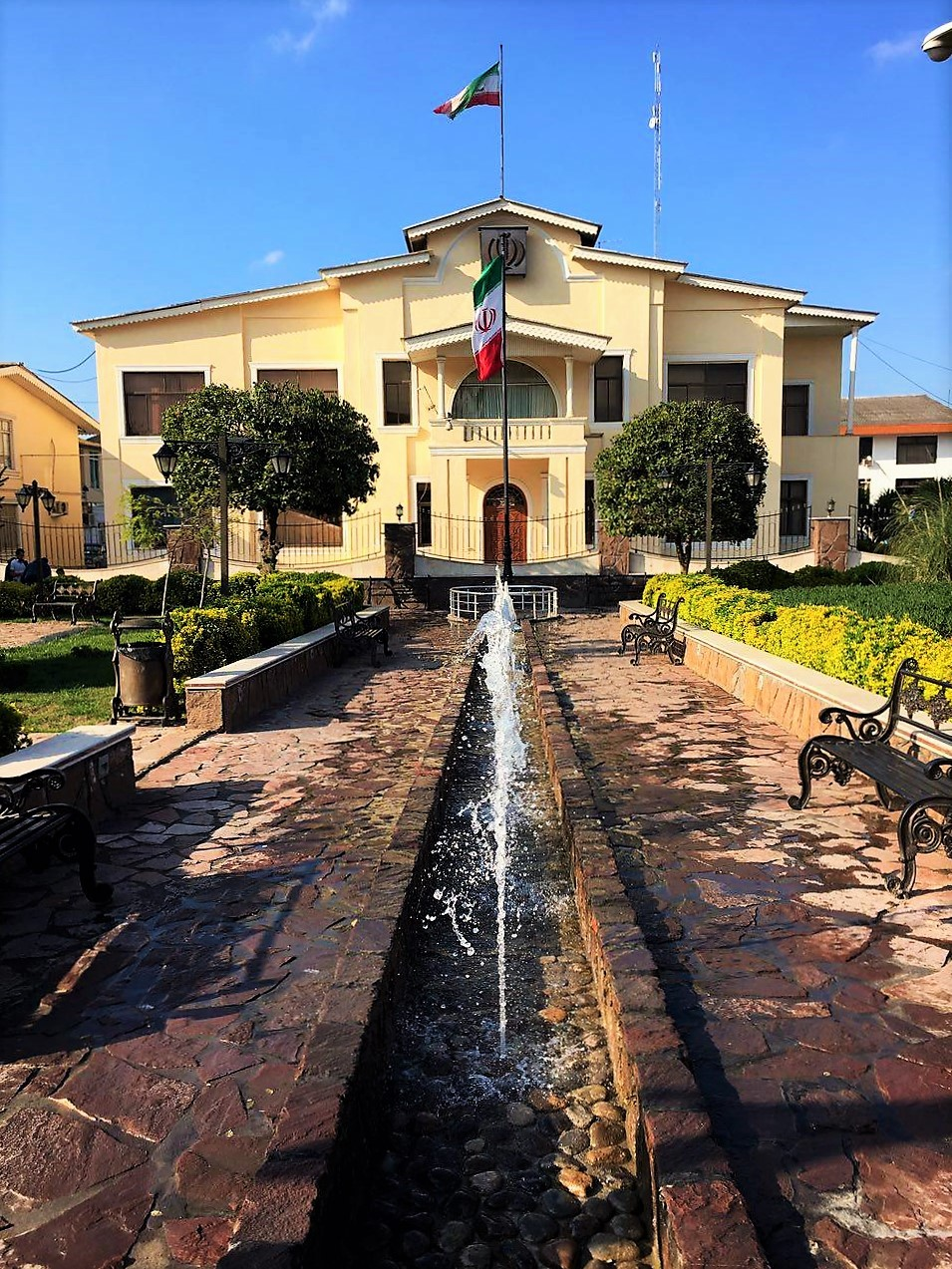
Municipal mansion Amol

During the reign of Mohammad Reza Pahlavi, The construction of Taleb Amoli Street in the western part of the old city and its extension from 1973 to 1975 was completed, and the texture of the city was changed. Street Shahpur, Street Reza Shah Kabir, Street Farhang, Street Saadi, Shir-o-Khorshid Hospital, Imamzadeh Abdollah, and Spinning, weaving, and textile factories were built. Road 77, Sepah-e Danesh school, Paddy factory, Grundig and Kubota in Iran came to fruition in 1963. Supporting Abali Hotel, Rineh Tourism Center, and Reinforcement of Amol Port was done as a tourism project. During this period, the municipal sewage system and electricity were modernized. During this period, behest of Reza Shah the railway between Tehran and Amol began seventeen years ago, and gradually a large part of it was built, except for sixty kilometers between Abegarm and Amol, Which totally stopped construction in September in the beginning Anglo-Soviet invasion to Iran. At the end of the kingdom, an agreement was signed between the Ministry of Agriculture of the Pahlavi Government of Iran and the Ministry of Economic Affairs of the Republic of China on the extension of agricultural technical cooperation to develop research and increase rice production and was implemented at the Amol Rice Research Institute of Iran.

Following the 1979 Iranian revolution and with the establishment of the Islamic Republic of Iran, there was a forest uprising. The Jungle Uprising in 1982 of the Union of Iranian Communists (Sarbedaran) mobilized its forces to jungles around Amol and started wars against the Islamic Republic in those jungles. It finally organized a famous uprising on January 25, 1982. The Communist Union, based on its Maoist policy and with its mindset of guerrilla and peasant wars, established on the outskirts of the Haraz Road pathway of several important provinces and cities of the country and suitable camouflage of Amol forest and mine reasons to choose in the forest its strategy for war. The union assassinated 600 people during three operations in Amol on November 9 and 13, 1981, and January 25, 1982. The Mojahedin used machine guns and rocket-propelled grenade launchers against units of the Pasdaran. Smaller left-wing opposition groups, including the Organization of Iranian People's Fedai Guerrillas, attempted similar guerrilla activities. In July 1981, members of the Union of Communists tried to seize control of the town of Amol. This uprising was a failure, and most of the Maoist and UIC leaders were hanged, but the uprising itself became very famous and is well respected among some Iranian Leftist organizations. It also experienced various theoretical and political crises. The clashes lasted from November to February for four months.

This day became known in the Iranian calendar as Epic 6 Bahman or Epic of the People of Amol. After this incident, Ruhollah Khomeini only mentioned the name of the city of Amol in the political and divine testament and wrote, We have to thank the people of Amol.

==== 21st century ====
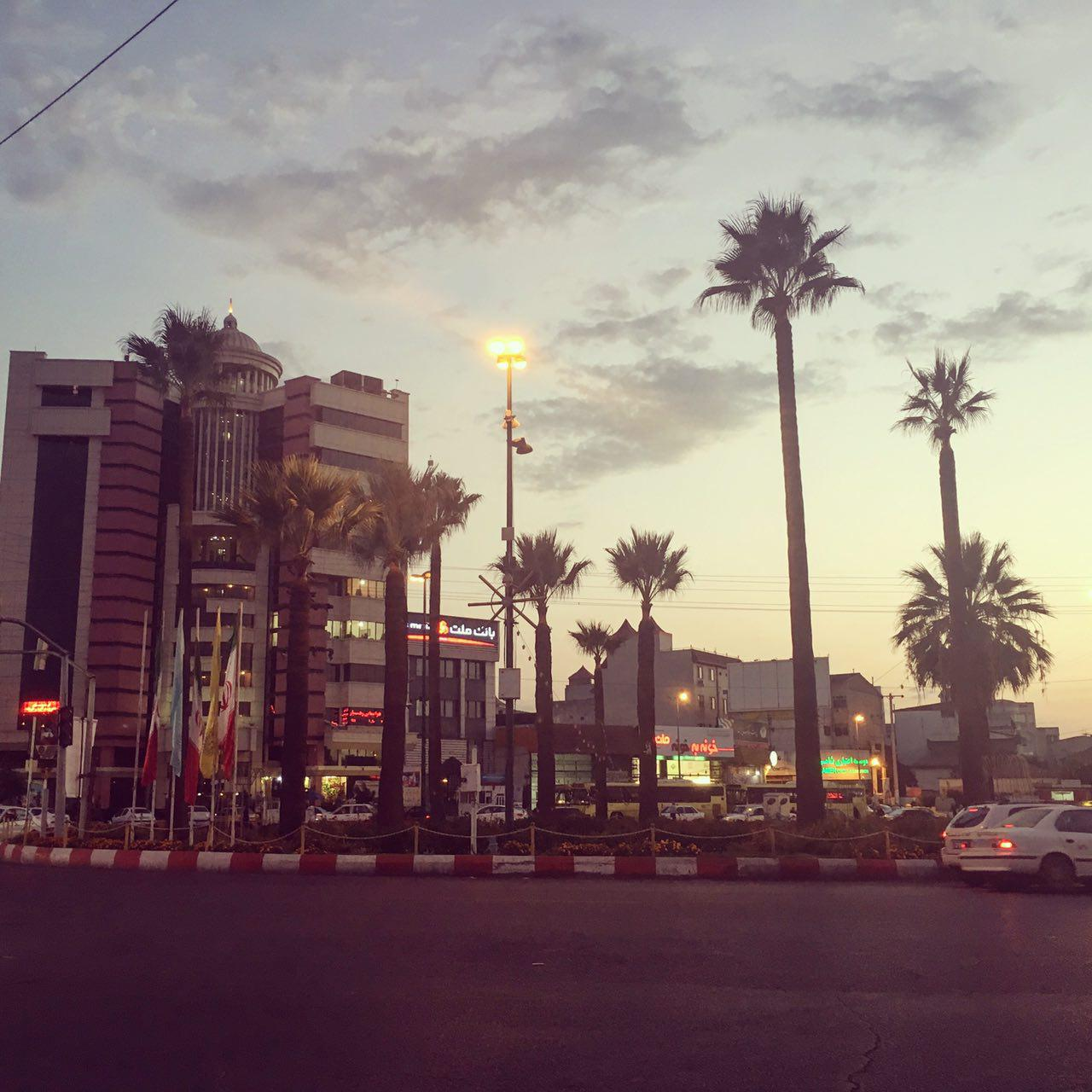
17 Shahrivar Square (downtown)

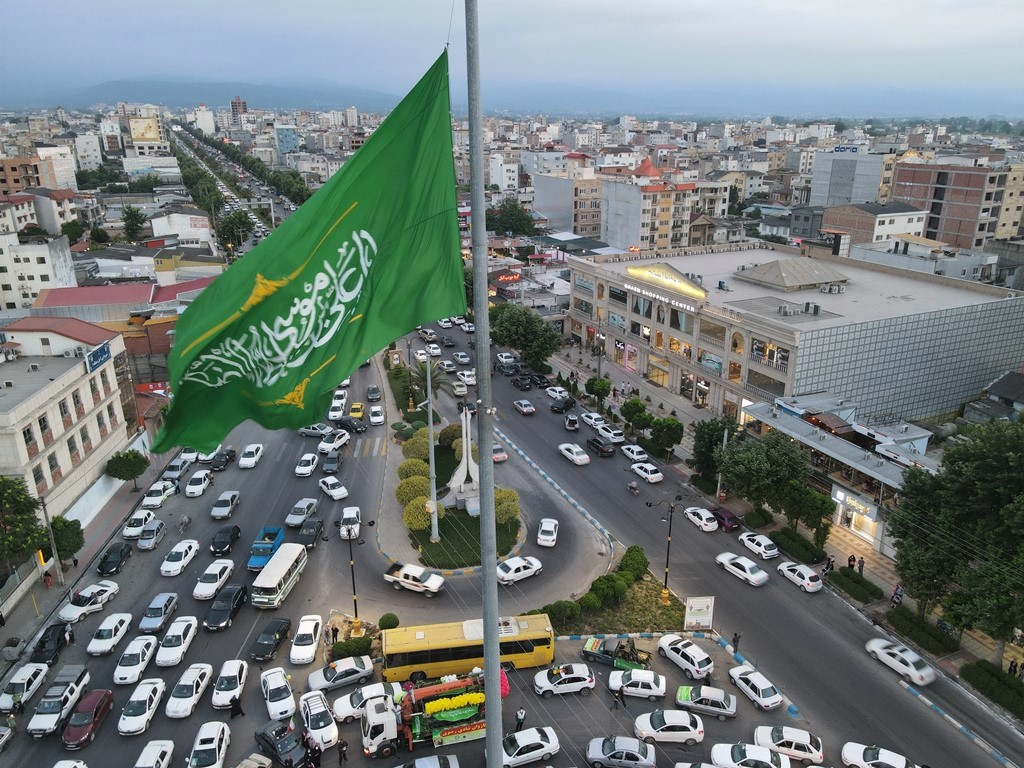
Ghaem Square Amol from the top

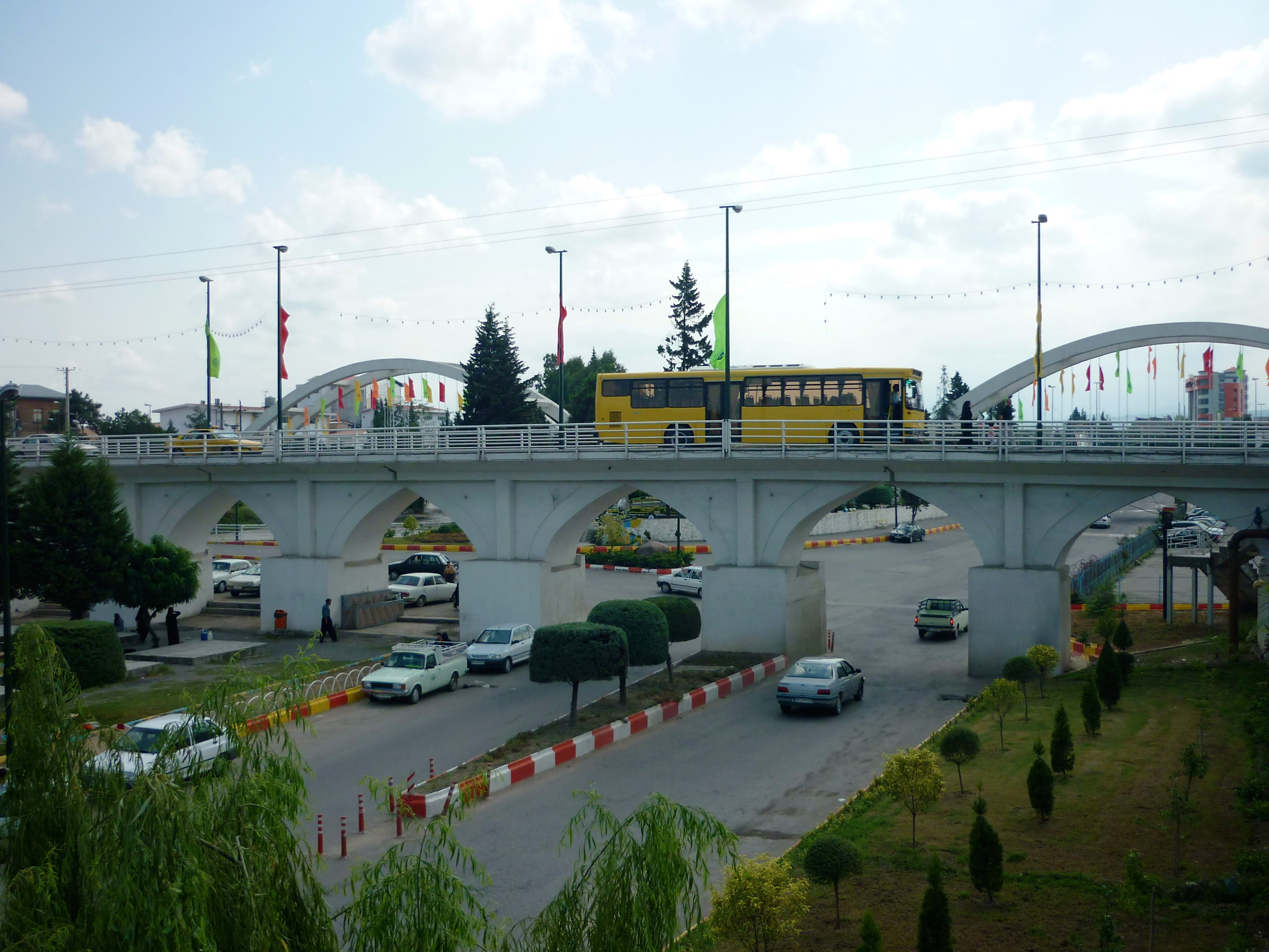
Today, most traffic of the city, and connection from the north and south of the city is through these two bridges

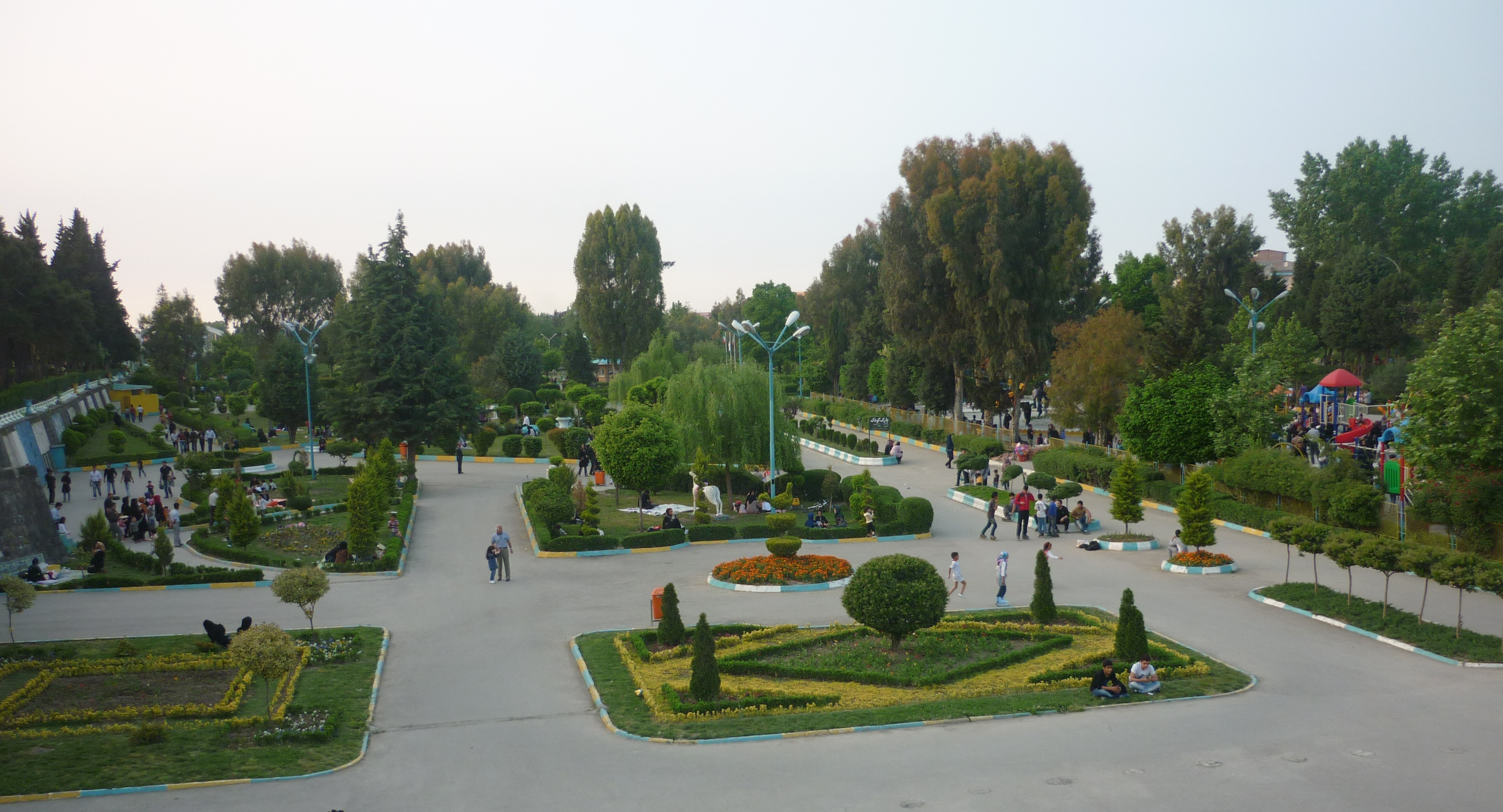
Talaei park

Some of the most recent projects have been the complete restoration of the Bazaar and of Imam Reza Street, as well as a comprehensive plan for the preservation of the old city quarters. A lot of different construction projects are currently underway, that intend to modernize the city's infrastructure. In the last few years, many squares, towers, boulevards, and bridges were built in Amol. For example, Haraz Street is one of the most modern streets of northern Iran. Amol is growing and turning into an industrialized town like most of the large Iranian cities. Today, Amol is a thriving metropolis. One of the things they really lack is an airport so there are no cheap flights to Amol. Some of the most famous companies in Iran have main offices located in this city. Good secondary and tertiary education is being offered here as well. Islamic Azad University, for instance, is one of the biggest universities in the Middle East. Now in Amol, there is a municipality and special governor. Amol is one of the research centers for scientific development, knowledge-based sciences, and the Science and Technology Park of Iran. At present, Amol is the center of dairy and livestock products, mining sand, nurturing products such as meat, flowers, and fish, and producing rice in Iran. Industrial machinery products are also very popular in Amol and Iran Heavy Diesel Factory is located in Amol Industrial Town.

At present especially since 2017, in addition to mass construction of residential buildings, the construction of small streets and hall sports in the deprived areas of the city has accelerated.

=== Bitter events ===
- Amol Gullies were completely destroyed. Since the Sasanian Empire then, the town has suffered earthquake and flood damage several times, but each time, it has recovered, and it is still a considerable town. During the Pahlavi dynasty, the city was burned twice due to fire.
- Flooding in Mount Deryouk, and the destruction of the entire city.
- Dangerous diseases that plague the year 1198 AH
- The outbreak of the dangerous plague that took place in 1198 AH destroyed countless civilians
- The war of the local kings with the Arabs
- Mongol invasion of Genghis Khan and his descendants to Tabaristan
- Wajih ad-Din Masud attack in Amol
- Battle Alavid and Saffarian Samanid in Amol
- Battle House of Karen and Bavandids in the city
- Samanid Empire attack to royan and Amol with the House of Ispahbudhan
- Timur war with the kings Marashis and killing people and battle with Iskandar-i shaykhi
- Attack Mas'ud I of Ghazni on the city
- Shah Ismail I and Shah Abbas Safavid King wars attack the Amol and killing people
- Agha Mohammad Khan Qajar attacked the Larijan and Amol, killing people and destroying the city
- Conflagration in 1335 AH caused a lot of damage and severe destruction to the city. This fire and fire occurred in the year 6 AH, which first started near the Niyaki ridge and was swept across the city by the wind and reached the Haraz River, causing a fire to the gunpowder shop and ammunition shop. The shop exploded and a terrible fire broke out across the river, and then the whole city of Amol was blown away by the wind. It is known that the fire took place in April when residents were enjoying the Nowruz celebration, and much of the city was turned gray
- Sangchal (Bandpay) earthquake of July 2, 1957
- Destroying people with Disease glanders

=== First in Iran ===
- The first steel mill in Iran
- The first artillery and gunpowder workshop in Iran
- The first foundry in Iran
- The first modern railway in Iran
- The first banknote printing factory in Iran
- The first road building in Iran
- The first commercial port in northern Iran
- The first cotton gin factory in Iran
- The first mineral water factory in Iran
- The first mdf wood factory in Iran
- The oldest seminary in Iran

== Demographics ==
=== Language, religion, timeline ===
Most Amoli people speak the Mazandarani language - Tabari as a mother tongue; however, Persian is the most common language spoken in Iran and is the lingua franca.

Northern provinces of Iran in the Parthian or Sasanian eras, probably, were Zoroastrian. There are temples in the province. Mazandaran people converted to Islam around the second century AH. Amol, as the first prime city center, was a Twelver Shiite theocracy. At present, the majority of people are followers of Shia Islam. Mazandaran (including Amol) has its own calendar months in addition to the official Tabari calendar of the moon, used since the era of Yazdgerd. Based on experiments and research Max Planck Society, The people of Mazandaran have long been the most original people living in Iran.

=== Population ===
The population history of the city proper is as follows. All figures are official census figures from the Iranian Statistics Institute.

1956	1966	1976	1986	1991	1996	2006	2011	2016
22,251	40,076	68,963	118,242	139,923	159,092	197,470	219,915	237,528

Breakdown of 2006 census:

Total	Male	Female	Family
197,470	98,337	99,133	55,183

At the time of the 2006 National Census, the city's population was 197,470 in 551,183 households. The following census in 2011 counted 219,915 people in 67,182 households. The 2016 census measured the population of the city as 237,528 people in 78,597 households.

== Geography ==
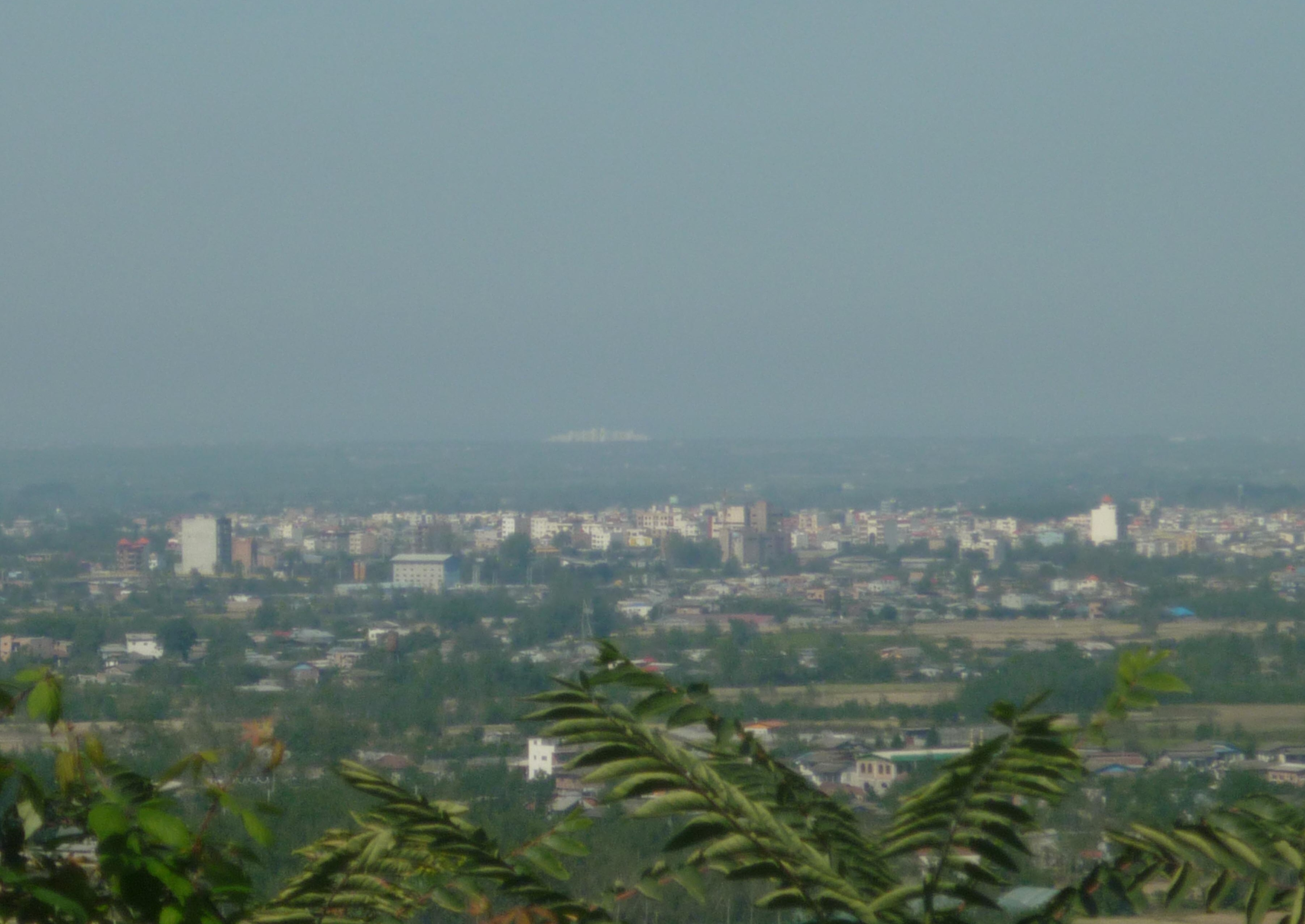
illustration part of town from a hill

Amol is located on the banks of the Haraz River (26 25'N 52 21'E) at an altitude of 76 m above the sea. It is about 18 km from the Caspian Sea and about 10 km from the northern Alborz mountains. It is 180 km from the Iranian capital, Tehran, with a picturesque drive through Haraz Road. Sari, the capital of Mazandaran, is 70 km east of Amol. Mount Damavand (5610 m), the highest peak in the Middle East, is located south of Amol. Amol, with its elevated landscape and valleys, has dense forests. Its tall hills overlook the plains and stretch out to the high slopes of the Mount Damavand. The majestic and deep rocky valleys, rivers, numerous springs, elevated waterfalls, colorful vegetation, a variety of wild life, thermal springs, summer quarters, and rural settlements are some of the special factors which can prove attractive. The city has Mediterranean climate with very hot summers and cool and humid winters. Maximum rainfall is usually in the month of December and minimum in the month of July.

=== Ecology ===
Amol has several dense forests and pastures. The ecology of Tabaristan region had been an impediment to providing a regularly communicative path, and the Haraz path is one of the oldest ones that joined the north of Iran to the central plateau in different periods. A study attempts to deal with archaeological data of this communicative path in the Sasanian era and at the beginning of Islam. A descriptive-analytical method and scaling archeological investigation in the region have been used in the study. The vegetation of the region can be divided into forest and grassland. Caspian horse, which is also called Khazar Horse was found for the first time in Amol rediscovered in 1965 by Louise Firouz. Mazandaran tiger also lived in the forests around Amol .

=== Coherent ===
Haraz Dam is the biggest dam north of Iran under construction on the Haraz River about 20 km from Amol in the year 2009 by Khatam al-Anbiya Construction Headquarters. It is a 150-meter earth rockfill dam with 8.6 million cubic meters of fill volume.

JGC Corporation has also held talks to build a waste-to-energy plant, also known as waste incinerator, in the city of Amol in the northern Mazandaran Province.

=== Climate ===
Amol has somewhat short but hot summers and mild to cool winters. Köppen-Geiger climate classification system classifies its climate as Mediterranean (Köppen: Csa, Trewartha: Cs).

Amol experiences around 114 rainy days per year and an annual precipitation of 671 mm (26.4 in) (data for 2001-2017 period). The wettest season is autumn and the driest is summer. There are 12 days per year with frost, generally from December to March and snowfall is common in winter. The highest recorded temperature was 39.2 °C (102.6 °F) on 31 May 2015 and lowest recorded was −8.0 °C (17.6 °F) on 8 January 2008. The highest recorded 24-hour precipitation was 92 mm (3.6 in) on 17 October 2017 and the highest snow height was 24 cm (9.4 in) on 8 January 2008.

Climate data for Amol (2001-2005)
Month	Jan	Feb	Mar	Apr	May	Jun	Jul	Aug	Sep	Oct	Nov	Dec	Year
Mean daily maximum °C (°F)	13.0 (55.4)	13.8 (56.8)	15.7 (60.3)	19.0 (66.2)	23.6 (74.5)	27.0 (80.6)	29.9 (85.8)	31.2 (88.2)	28.4 (83.1)	24.7 (76.5)	19.1 (66.4)	14.0 (57.2)	21.6 (70.9)
Daily mean °C (°F)	8.4 (47.1)	9.1 (48.4)	11.5 (52.7)	15.0 (59.0)	19.9 (67.8)	23.6 (74.5)	26.0 (78.8)	27.0 (80.6)	24.3 (75.7)	20.1 (68.2)	14.3 (57.7)	9.7 (49.5)	17.4 (63.3)
Mean daily minimum °C (°F)	3.8 (38.8)	4.5 (40.1)	7.6 (45.7)	11.0 (51.8)	16.2 (61.2)	20.2 (68.4)	22.1 (71.8)	22.7 (72.9)	20.2 (68.4)	15.5 (59.9)	9.6 (49.3)	5.3 (41.5)	13.2 (55.8)
Average precipitation mm (inches)	65.39 (2.57)	55.25 (2.18)	55.23 (2.17)	32.23 (1.27)	22.10 (0.87)	15.54 (0.61)	15.14 (0.60)	18.65 (0.73)	63.84 (2.51)	71.39 (2.81)	95.56 (3.76)	72.61 (2.86)	582.93 (22.94)
Average extreme snow depth cm (inches)	1.0 (0.4)	0.91 (0.36)	0 (0)	0 (0)	0 (0)	0 (0)	0 (0)	0 (0)	0 (0)	0 (0)	0.55 (0.22)	0 (0)	1.0 (0.4)
Average relative humidity (%)	79	76	79	77	75	75	75	75	77	78	79	81	77
Mean monthly sunshine hours	131	135.5	124.5	134.3	188.5	192.2	206.6	179.2	134.6	164.2	142.9	129.7	1,863.2
Source: IRIMO(Temperatures), (Precipitation 2001-2010), (Humidity), (Sun) Snow depth (2007-2023)

Climate data for Amol
Month	Jan	Feb	Mar	Apr	May	Jun	Jul	Aug	Sep	Oct	Nov	Dec	Year
Mean daily maximum °C (°F)	11.5 (52.7)	11.8 (53.2)	14.5 (58.1)	19.8 (67.6)	25.1 (77.2)	29.8 (85.6)	32.3 (90.1)	31.9 (89.4)	29.0 (84.2)	23.8 (74.8)	18.6 (65.5)	13.9 (57.0)	21.8 (71.3)
Mean daily minimum °C (°F)	3.2 (37.8)	4.0 (39.2)	7.0 (44.6)	11.5 (52.7)	16.5 (61.7)	21.0 (69.8)	23.3 (73.9)	23.0 (73.4)	20.0 (68.0)	14.6 (58.3)	9.6 (49.3)	5.2 (41.4)	13.2 (55.8)
Average rainfall mm (inches)	80 (3.1)	58 (2.3)	59 (2.3)	29 (1.1)	19 (0.7)	19 (0.7)	20 (0.8)	49 (1.9)	70 (2.8)	139 (5.5)	100 (3.9)	107 (4.2)	749 (29.3)
Average snowfall cm (inches)	1.2 (0.5)	3.1 (1.2)	1.6 (0.6)	0.0 (0.0)	0.0 (0.0)	0.0 (0.0)	0.0 (0.0)	0.0 (0.0)	0.0 (0.0)	0.0 (0.0)	1.2 (0.5)	0.1 (0.0)	7.2 (2.8)
Average rainy days	10	9	11	9	7	5	4	7	7	8	8	10	95
Average snowy days	0.4	1.4	0.3	0	0	0	0	0	0	0	0.4	0.1	2.6
Average relative humidity (%)	81	78	77	73	70	66	67	69	70	74	77	81	74
Mean daily daylight hours	10	10.9	12	13.1	14.1	14.6	14.4	13.5	12.4	11.2	10.2	9.7	12.2
Average ultraviolet index	3	4	3	5	6	7	7	7	6	4	4	4	5
Source: Weather2visit, Weather atlas(Snow-daylight-UV)

=== Weather ===
The climate of Amol city is similar to other parts of Mazandaran; in hot and humid summers and mild winters. The maximum amount of rainfall falls in December and the least in July. It has a special climate in its regions.

== Excavation sites ==
In recent years, during the excavation of the hill of Qaleh Kesh, some ancient jewelry was discovered. Radiocarbon analysis revealed the background of the jewelry and objects to date from the 1st millennium BC or from the Bronze Age. New exploration of the Baliran works found the items to be from the Paleolithic Age.

== Economy ==
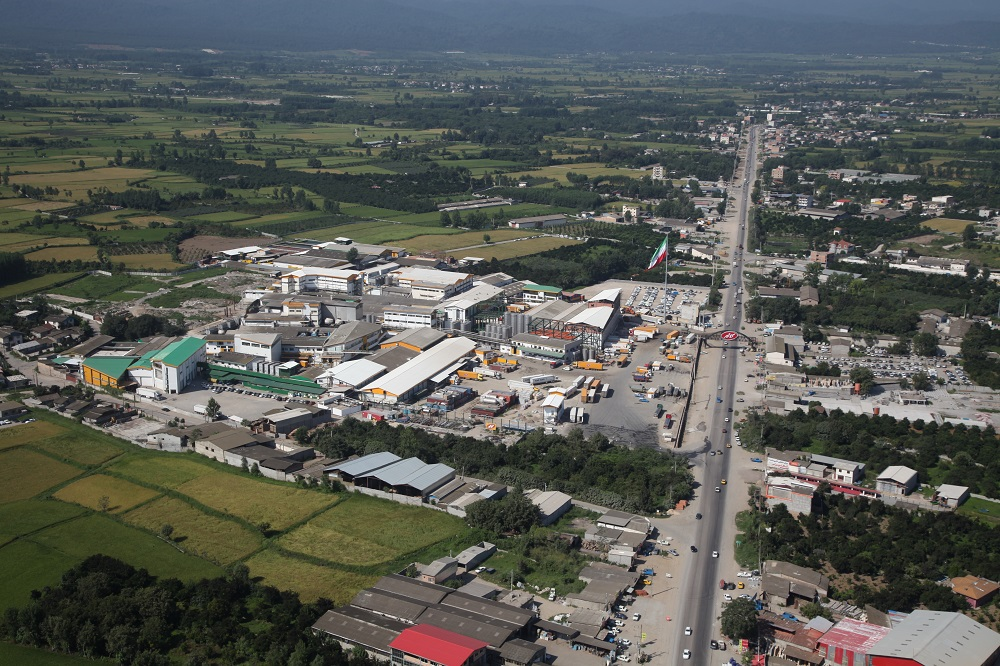
Kalleh Dairy Factory

Amol is the center of dairy, poultry, livestock products, Steel building, and rice in Iran. Mineral water, meat, dairy, wood, Metal machine products, and ingots are the main production industries that are in the city. Agriculture and Tourism are the basic contrutor of the economy. Amol has an economic base is in its provincial products. Agriculture has always been a major part of the economy in and around Amol.

Amol is the economic center of Mazandaran province, with Agriculture and Tourism being the base of the Amol economy. Rice, grain, fruits, cotton, tea, sugarcane, and silk are produced in the lowland. Mineral water, meat, dairy, wood and ingots are the main manufacturing industry. 68% of exports of Mazandaran done from Amol. In the 18th century – 19th century, Amol iron and iron goods were traded all over Iran and as far abroad as Baghdad and Damascus and the society. Linen, rice, handicrafts, honey, wood, mat and gold were regularly sent to the trade houses in Rome and the Gulf countries. Now Food products, Citrus, Ornamental flowers, Cement and sand, Meat products, Industrial machinery, Rapeseed, Power cord, Electronic equipment and Mineral water are regularly exported to several countries, including Afghanistan, Russia, Netherlands, Iraq, Pakistan, Turkmenistan, Turkey, Oman, Qatar, Angola, Oman, United Arab Emirates, Azerbaijan and Germany.

=== Rice ===
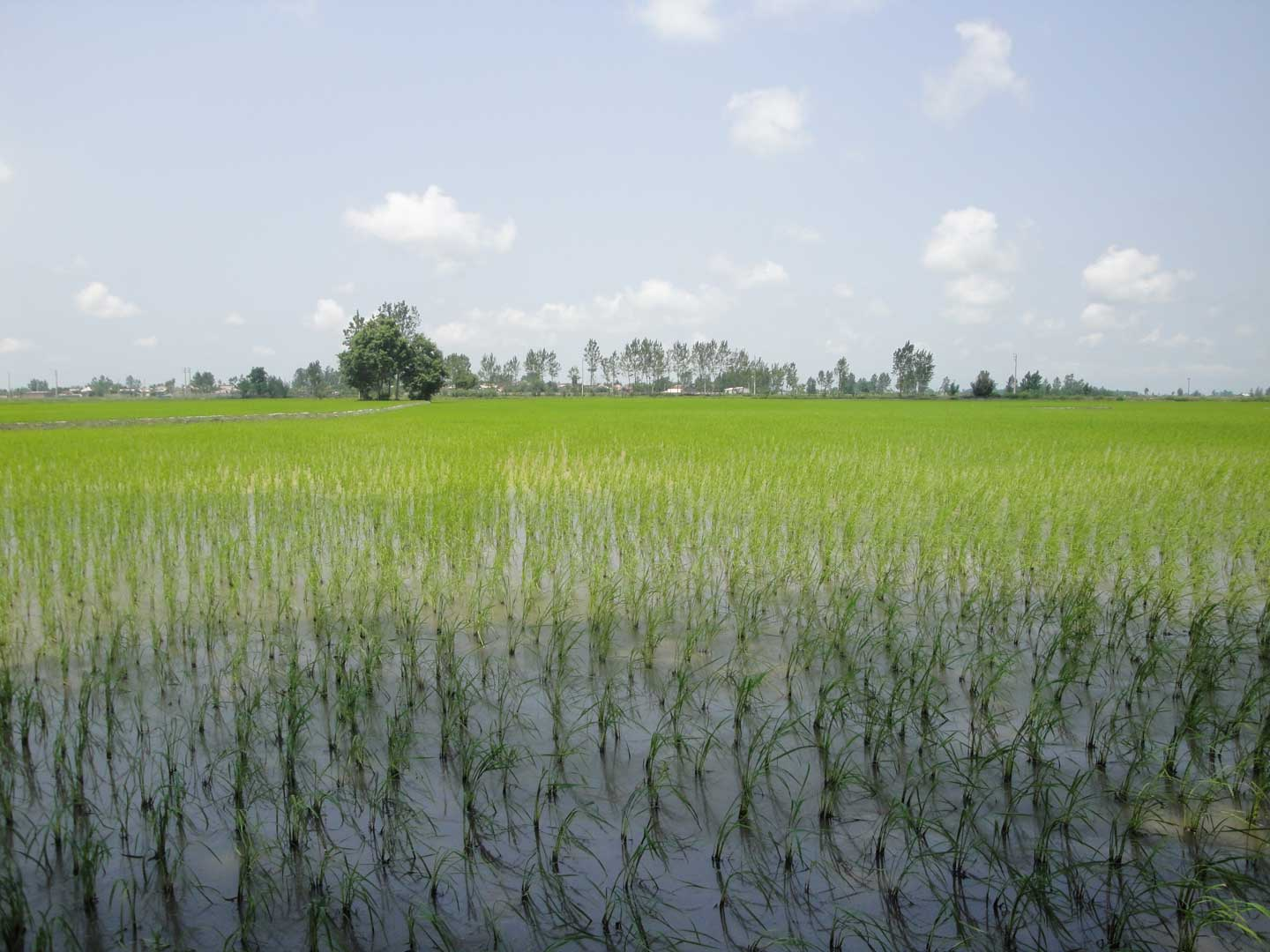
A typical rice paddy fields in the outskirts of Amol

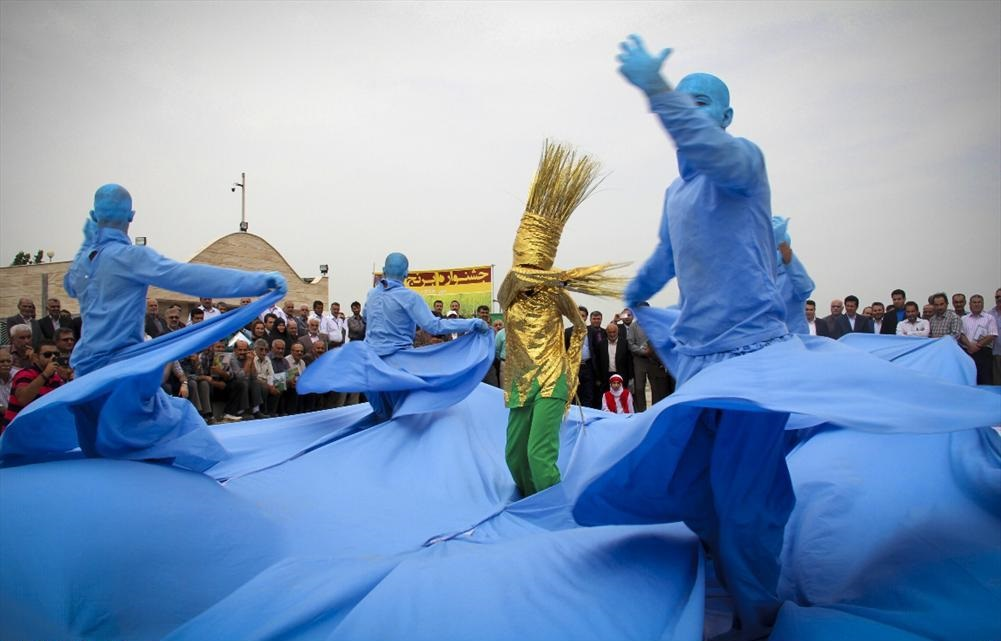
Iran Rice Festival at Amol

The Rice Research Institute of Iran was established in 1963 in Amol, and through its 50 years of research activity, it has had significant impacts on rice cultivation in the region. At the opening ceremony of the Institute located at Haraz Road, Mohammad Reza Shah Pahlavi introduced Amol as the capital of rice and science. Winston Churchill stated that Tehran was supplied with rice by Mazandaran because of transportation facilities through the Amol. Amol rice is considered a high-quality product and is exported across the world. Iran's rice export terminal at Amol was established 2016. Iran International Rice Trade Center and Export Terminal was inaugurated of Amol, on August 21, 2019, in the presence of First Vice President Hassan Rouhani. The center has been established with private investment amounting to over 1 trillion rials ($8.58 million) covering an area over 17 hectares. Nowadays, rice seedling celebrations are held every year in Amol.

=== Industry ===
Amol was one of the primary cities in the production of bricks, tobacco, rice, paper and guns since thousands of years ago. Ultra Quality Rice and Fresh Fruits are major products of the farmers. 65% industry in the Mazandaran province it is located in Amol. It is one of the centers meat and dairy products in Iran. Horticulture and greenhouse are the city's other important activities. The company, Solico including Kalleh Dairy and Kalleh Meat are three of the biggest corporations in Asia that are located in Amol. Currently, three industrial towns are active in the counties named Industrial Estate, Amol, Babakan Industrial Estate, and Tashbandan. Iran Heavy Diesel Manufacturing Company, the car and ship's locomotive engine maker is based in Amol. Iran's security papers, banknotes, checks, passport pages and birth certificates are produced by Takab, located in Amol.

==== Major corporations ====
Domestic companies

- Kalleh Company (dairy – meat)
- DESA Iran Heavy Diesel Manufacturing Company DESA
- Fouladin Zob (FZA)
- TAKAB Security Paper Mill – Iranian Money Printing
- Khazar Electric
- Haraz Dairy
- Delveseh Food Industries
- Polur Mineral Water
- Nestlé Iran
- Zarbal
- Abescon
- Nasaji Babakan
- Aras Bazar pharmaceutical Co
- Garma Electric
- Amolo Mineral Water
- Zarrin Soleh Jam
- Dirgodaz Amol
- Safa Industrial Group
- SPS
- Amol Boresh
- Mazandaran Cable
- Nava Mineral Water
- Baaz
- Tpciran
- Mollen
- Sepidan
- Gela Dairy
- Khazar Choob
- PGA (Peyman)
- Sangsa
- Kardar Group

Foreign companies

- Nestlé Pure Life
- Hochland SE

==== Native Industries ====
Pottery is common in the city. Pottery is the material from which the pottery ware is made, of which major types include earthenware, stoneware, and porcelain. The place where such wares are made is also called a pottery. Pottery also refers to the art or craft of the potter or the manufacture of pottery. There are also fish farming center in the foothills and around the city, including trout and sturgeon. Today, the percentage of aquaculture production in Amol is equal to the Caspian Sea.

=== Public Service ===
Shopping

The city is served by Refah Chain Stores Co., Iran Hyper Star, Isfahan City Center, Shahrvand Chain Stores Inc., Ofoq Kourosh chain store.

Most of the branded stores and upper-class shops are located in the center of the city streets, namely Mahdieh, Shahradari, 17 Shahrivar, Mostafa Khomeini, Heraz and Taleghani and Sabzeh Meydan neighborhood. The important shopping stores are

- Oxin City Center
- Aftab Mall
- Ghaem Shopping Center
- Sepehr complex
- Oxin Mall
- Ghaem Gold Mall
- Grand Passage Amol
- Morvarid Passage
- Farzaneh Passage
- Akhavan Passage
- Mirdamad Passage

Hotel

The first hotel in the city with the name Hotel Shahr was built by Austrian engineers in the year 1972 and used to be called Shahrdari (Municipality) Hotel. It was later renovated in 2014 to be used as an accommodation by visitors. Other well known hotels are

- City Hotel Amol
- Oxin Hotel
- Shomal Olympic Hotel
- Niloofar Hotel

Hospital

- Shomal Hospital (Medical tourism)
- Imam Khomeini Hospital
- Imam Reza Hospital
- 17 Shahrivar Hospital
- Imam Ali Hospital
- Peyman Hospital
- Nik Darman Hospital
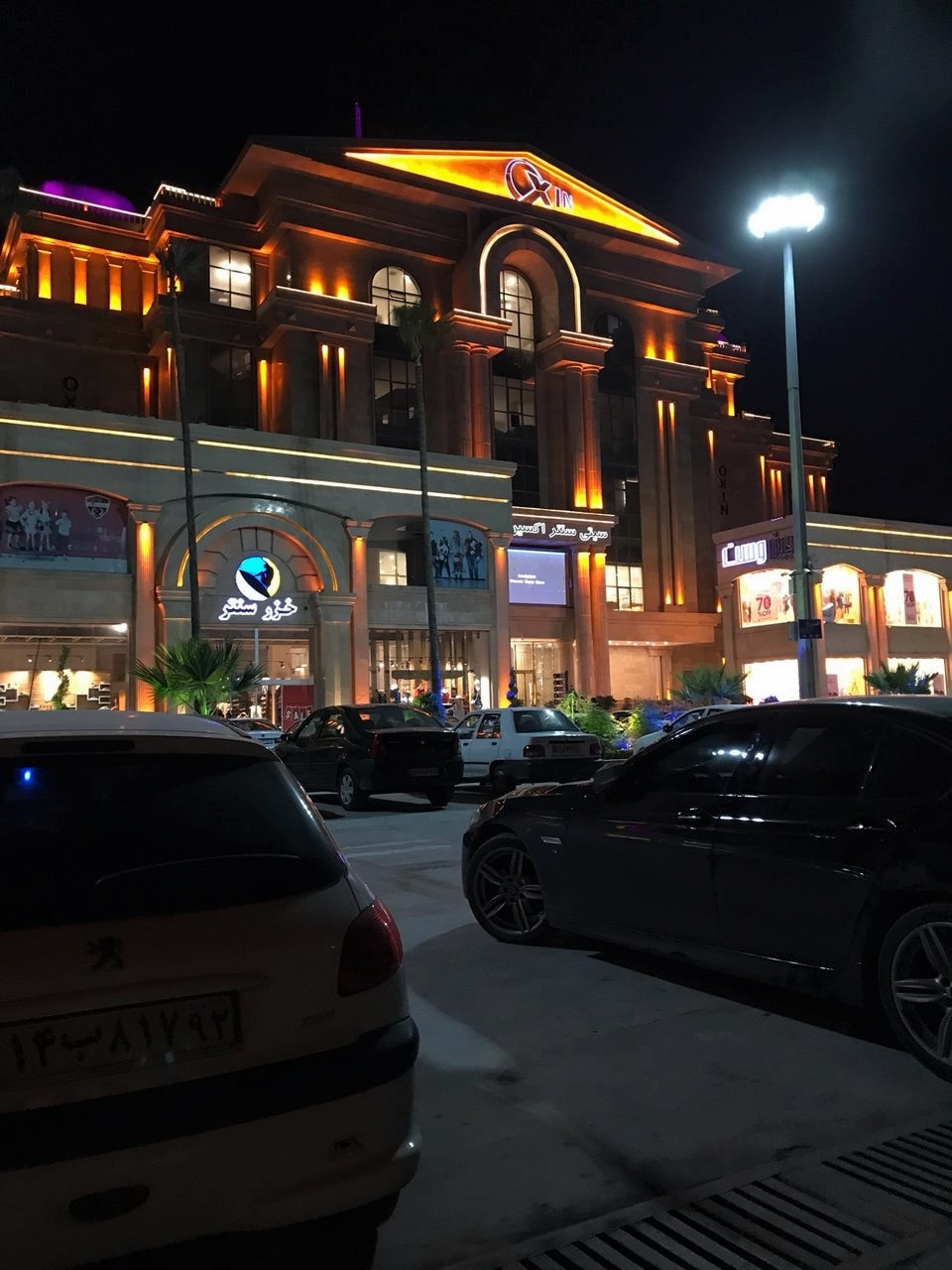
Oxin City Center

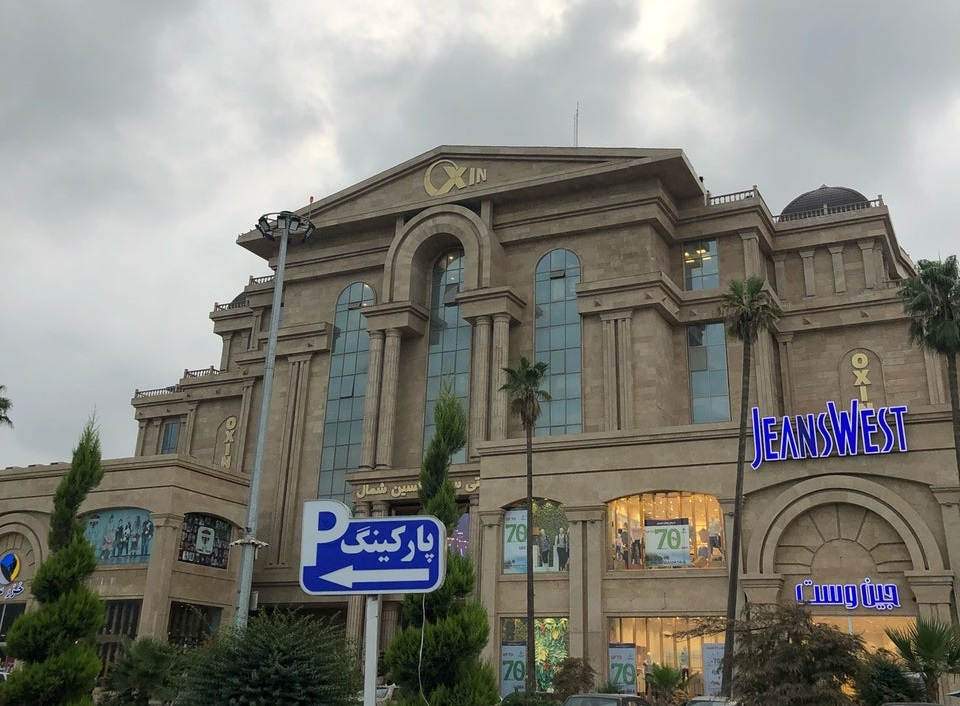
Oxin City Center

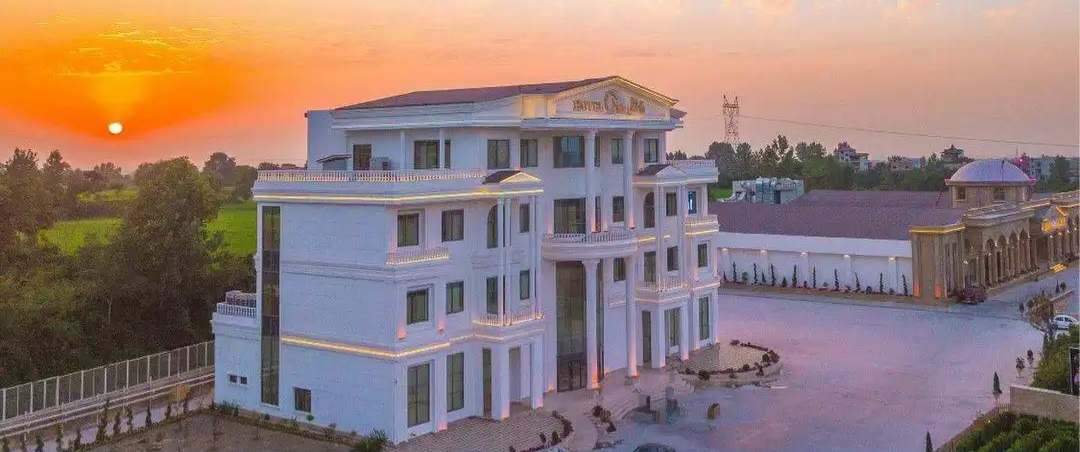
Oxin Hotel

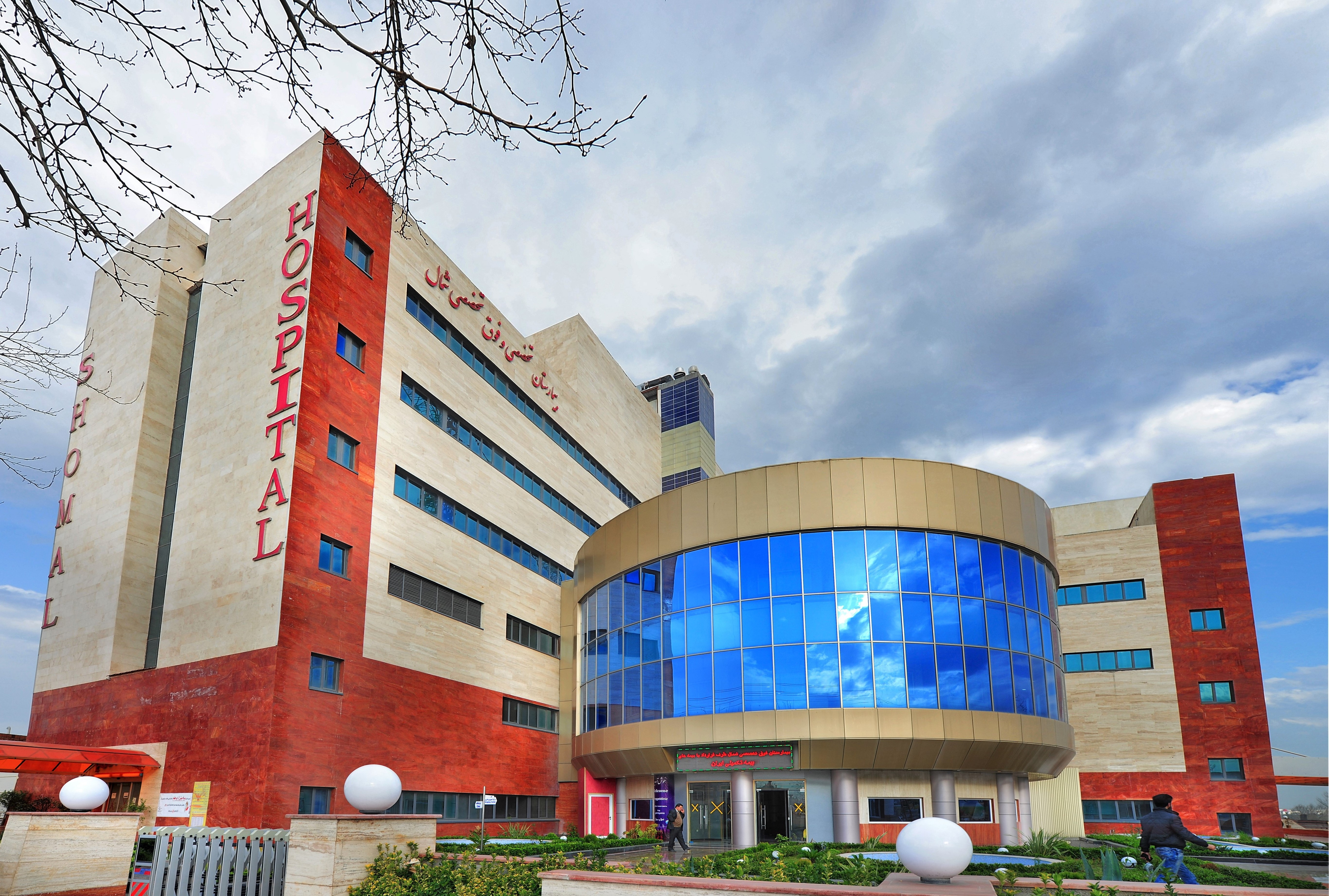
Shomal Hospital

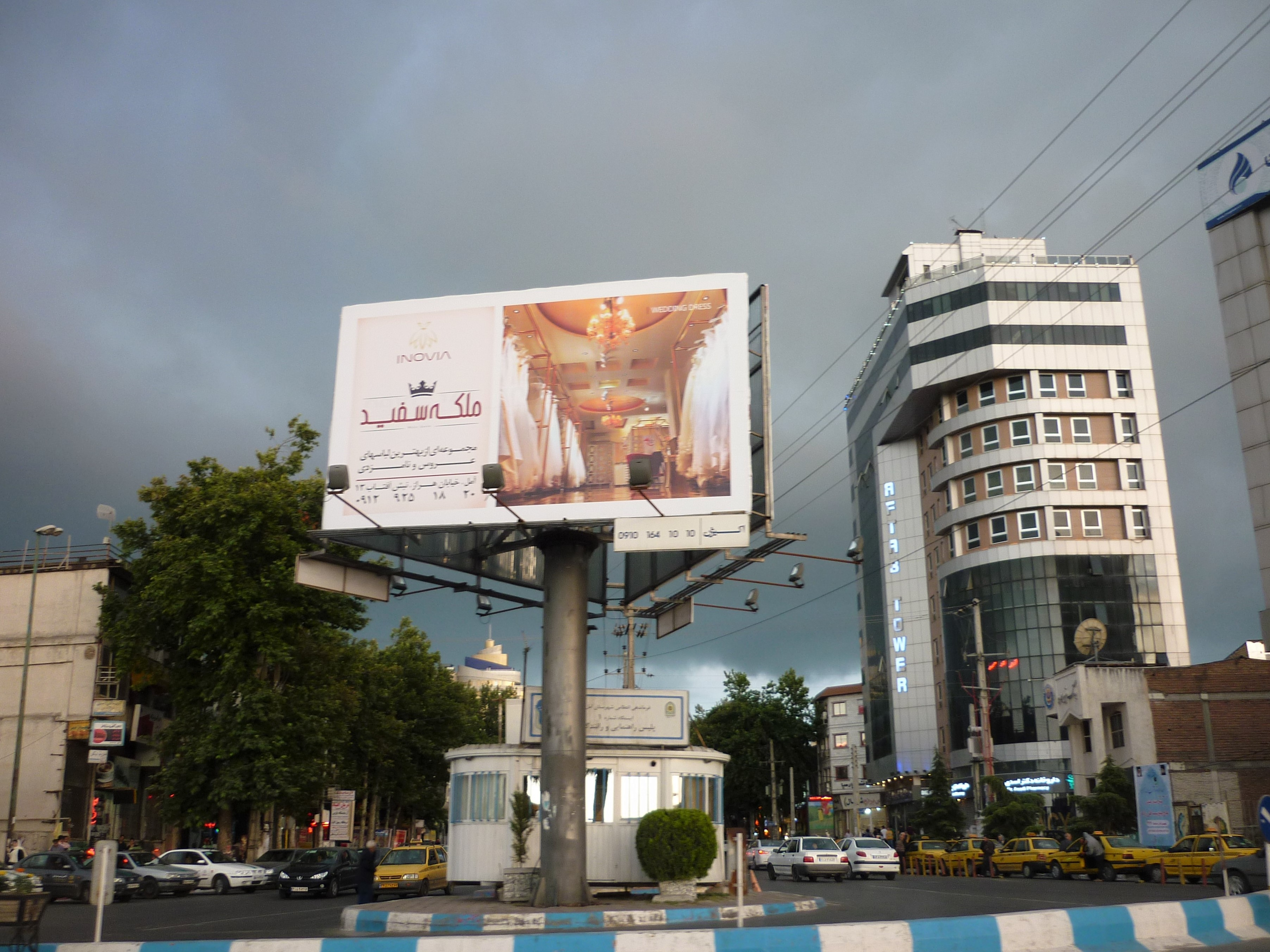
Aftab Shopping Center

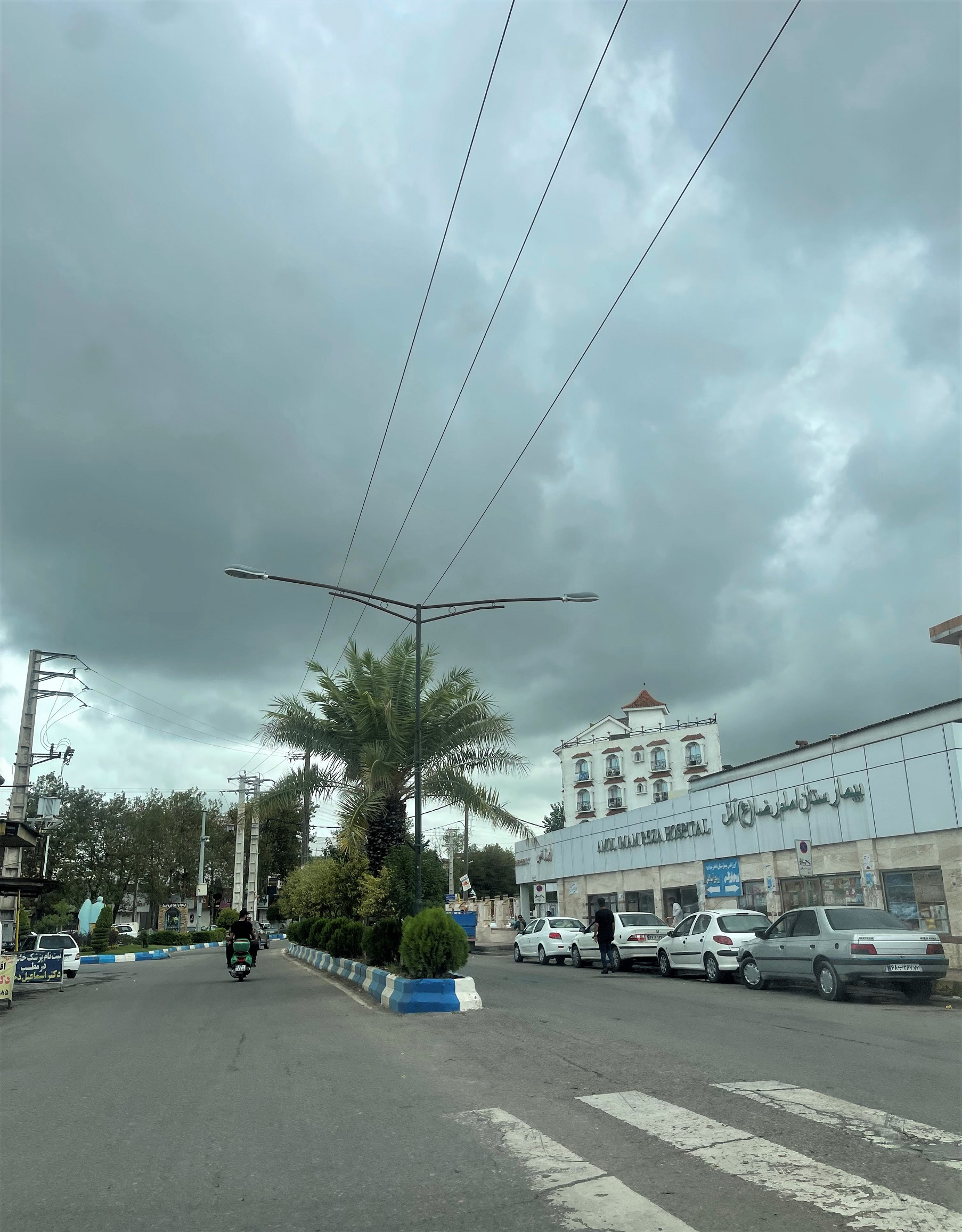
Imam Reza Hospital

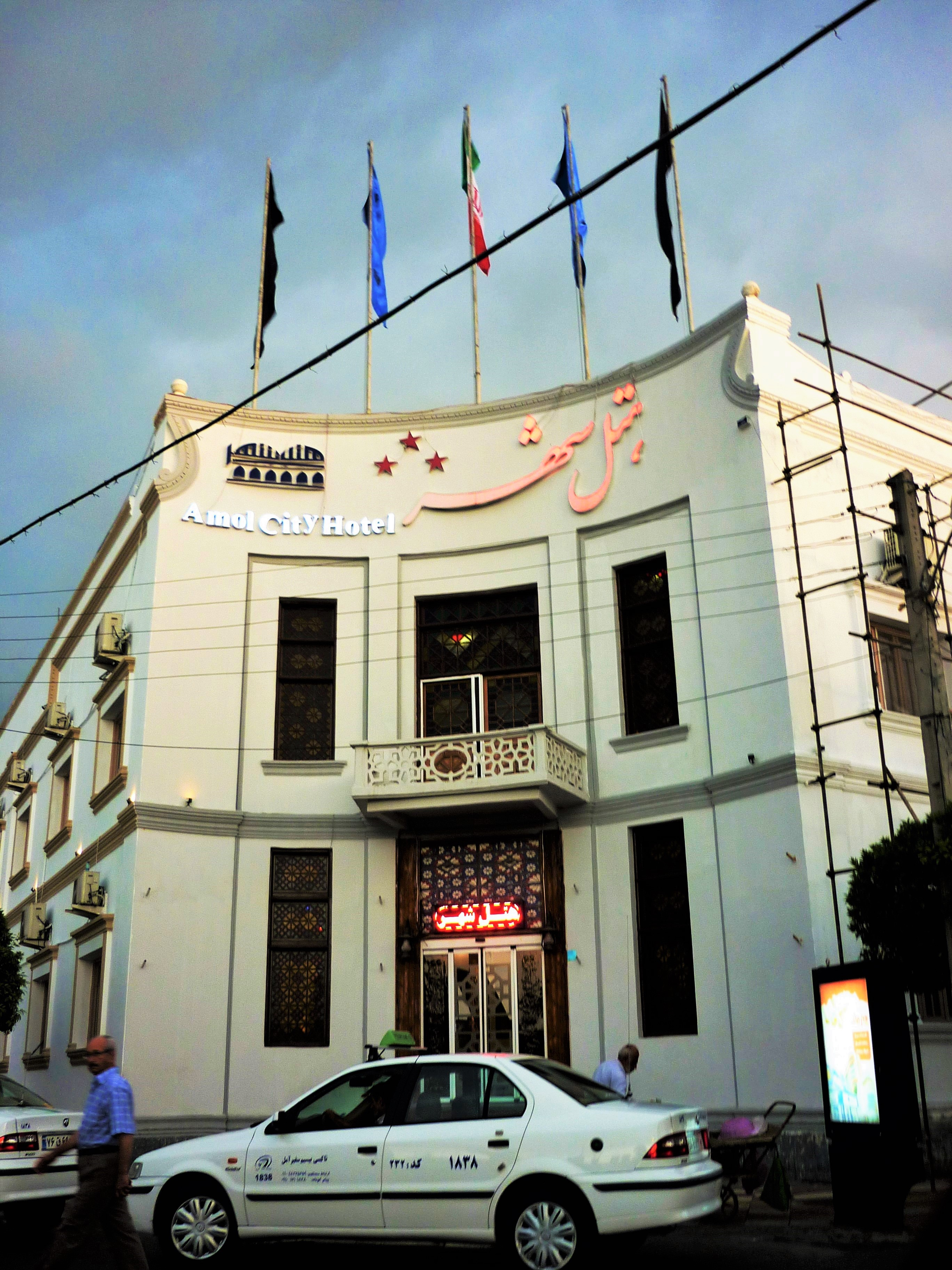
Hotel City (Hotel Shahr)

== Culture ==
Amol has a long history based on its ancestors, who were intellectuals and had great contributions to local and national events. Depending on the culture of the people some of the ancient ceremonies mingled with Mazandaran Islamic traditions. Amol is a center for Iranian culture and has produced a number of famous poets. Wool, felting, felt hat production, and mat weaving are part of the Amoli culture. Varf Chal, Locho Wrestling, Palm and Tiregan named Damavand National Day are local events held each year. Tirgan is an important celebration in Iran's history. In Mazandaran, this day is known as Tir Maah Sizdah Sho. The name literally means 13th night of the month of Tir. It occurs on the 12th of Aban, the 8th month of the Persian calendar, and is celebrated in the province of Mazandaran. Its history goes back to the pre-Islamic era of Iran and is mentioned in the accredited history book of Tarikh Tabari. The celebration has a specific procedure, 13 different kinds of edibles are prepared, and members of the household should stay home for that special night. Tiregan is one of the biggest festivals in ancient Iran. Traditionally, it is held on the Tir day (ancient days) of Tir month, equal to the 13th of the month in the Zoroastrian calendar, and equivalent to the 10th of Tir in Shamsi year. Tiregan is celebrated on the 13th of Tir in the foothills of Rineh city of Larijan in Amol, Mazandaran Province. It is celebrated by splashing water, dancing, reciting poetry, and serving traditional foods such as spinach soup and sholezard. The custom of tying rainbow-colored bands on wrists, which are worn for ten days and then thrown into a stream, is also a way to rejoice by the children of the city. Another ceremony is called Varf Chal. Every spring, people in Ab Ask, a village near the northern city of Amol, mark a 600-year-old ceremony called Varf Chal, which literally means snow storing.

Nowruz - Iranians celebrate this ancient festival and is also important in Amol. Nowruz Khani, or singing for Nowruz, is a Tabari Gilani tradition in which in the latest days of the year before the Persian New Year (Nowrooz), people go at the door of their neighbors and sing songs about the impending coming of the spring. Locho wrestling has been held in the north of Iran in Mazandaran as a traditional, frank, and ancient sport for 1600 years. This wrestling, which is also known as the Locho heroic sport, has a particular position in the culture and valuable beliefs of the locals, and now, it is a national registered heritage. Amoli people are said to spend much on books, clothes and food. They spend their leisure time going to cinemas, art exhibitions, music concerts, and international book fairs that are held in the city most of the time in the year. Amol is known as the city of Mystics and philosophers, Hezar sangar, Productive, and Alavian. Amol has been host Fajr International Theater Festival and Jasmine International Film Festival.

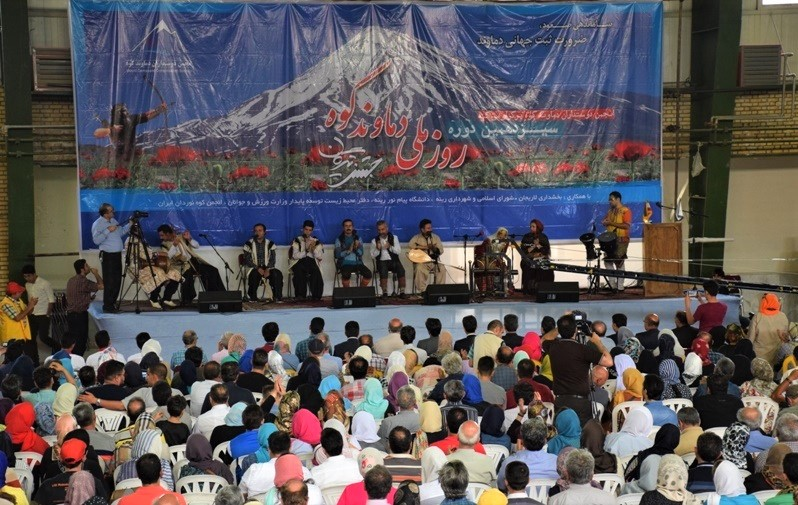
Tirgan and Damavand National Day Festival at Amol

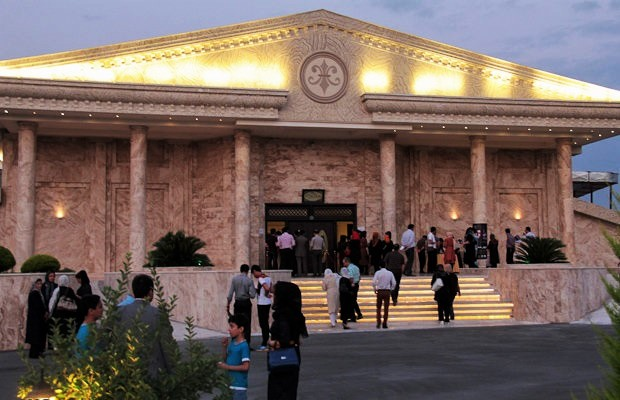
Arikeh Aryaei hall in Amol

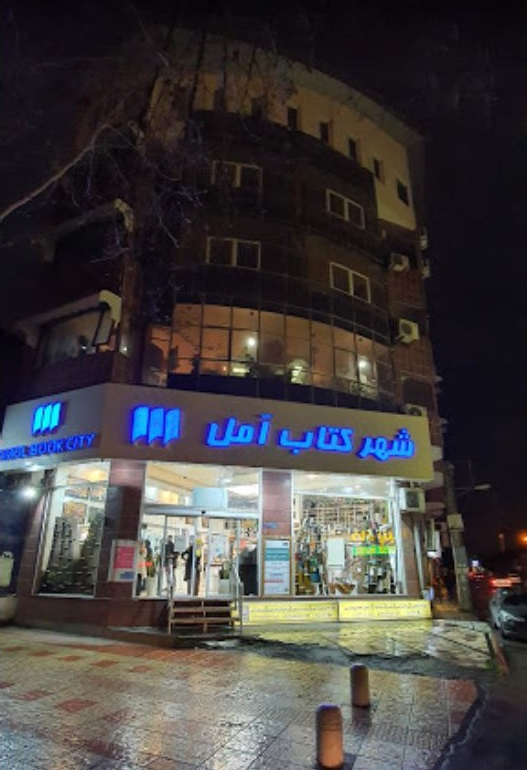
Book City in Amol

== Old city ==
=== Old district of Amol ===
The main body of the old city of Amol is located in the old bazaar of Amol. The old bazaar is the main pillar and core of the city's organizer, and its original existence dates back to before Islam and its core 900 years ago. The main constituents of the city Bazaar Amol, known as Paein Baazar or Bazaar Chaharsogh situated in the city center, have lost some of their former importance due to social, economic, and historical reasons. The roofs of the shops here are made of earthenware tiles on an incline so as to be a protection against the sun and rain. The open spaces within, are used to set up weekly bazaars. Historic mosques and old houses located along the market and tribal quarters of the people are also available in the market. Tuesday era Sassanid, Qajar and contemporary is evident in the alleys of the market and its neighborhoods.

=== Older neighborhoods ===
- Bazaar Chahar Soogh (بازار چهارسوق)
- Kashi Mahaleh (کاشی محله)
- Moshaei Mahaleh (مشایی محله)
- Shahandasht Mahaleh (شاهاندشت محله)
- Shahrbanu Mahaleh (شهربانو محله)
- Kardgar Mahaleh Amiriha (کاردگر محله امیری ها)
- Gorji Mahaleh (گرجی محله)
- Espeh-Kola (اسپه کلا)
- Qadi Mahaleh (قادی محله)
- Niaki Mahaleh (نیاکی محله)
- Rodgari Mahaleh Chaksar (رودگری محله چاکسر)
- Gol Bagh Mahaleh (گلباغ محله)
- Aski Mahaleh (اسکی محله)
- Chelabi Mahaleh (چلابی محله)
- Khavar Mahaleh (خاور محله)
- Haron Mahaleh (هارون محله)
- Sabze Meydan (سبزه میدان)
- Rezvanieh (رضوانیه)
- Avam Koy (عوام کوی)

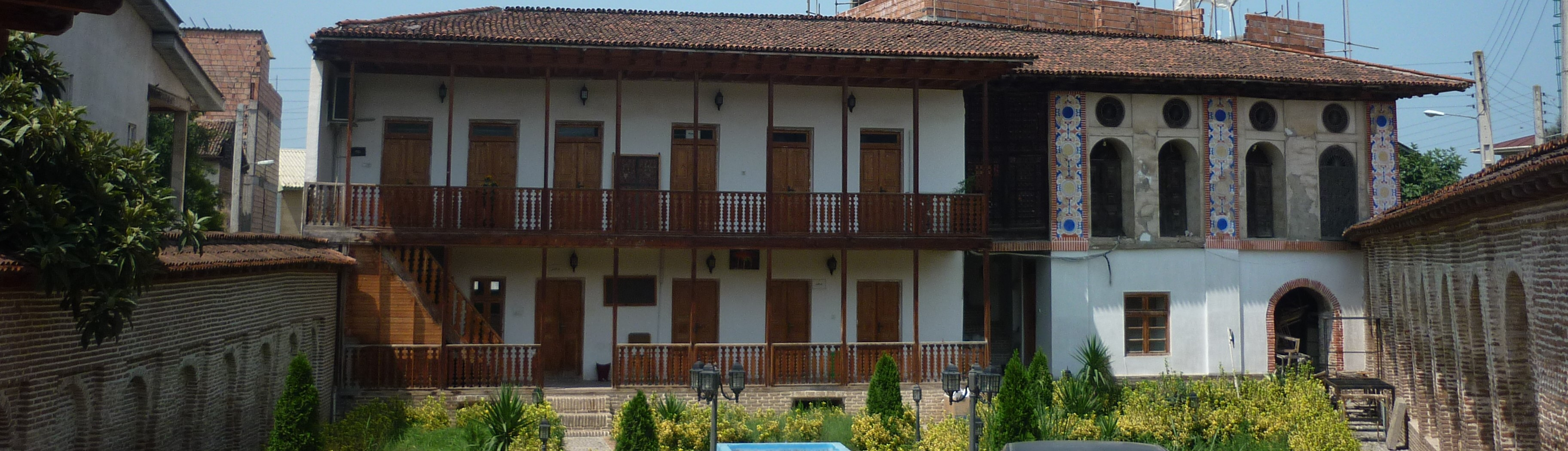
Manouchehri House in old Amol

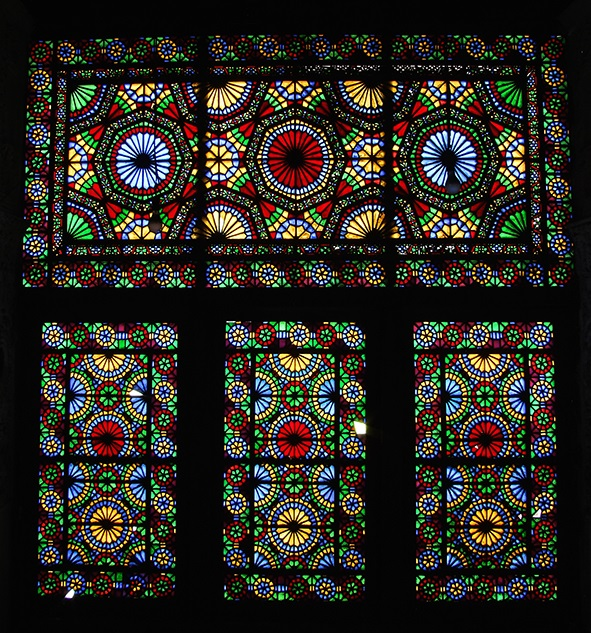
Window Shafahi House in old Amol

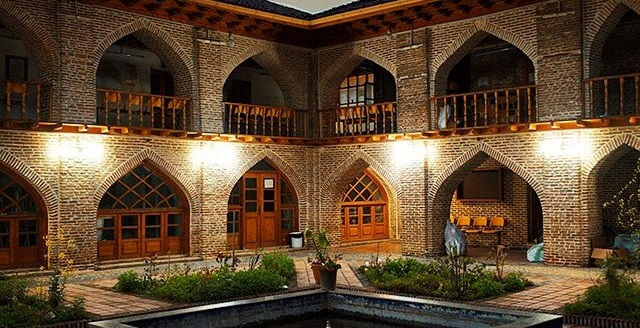
Agha Abbas Mosque in old Amol

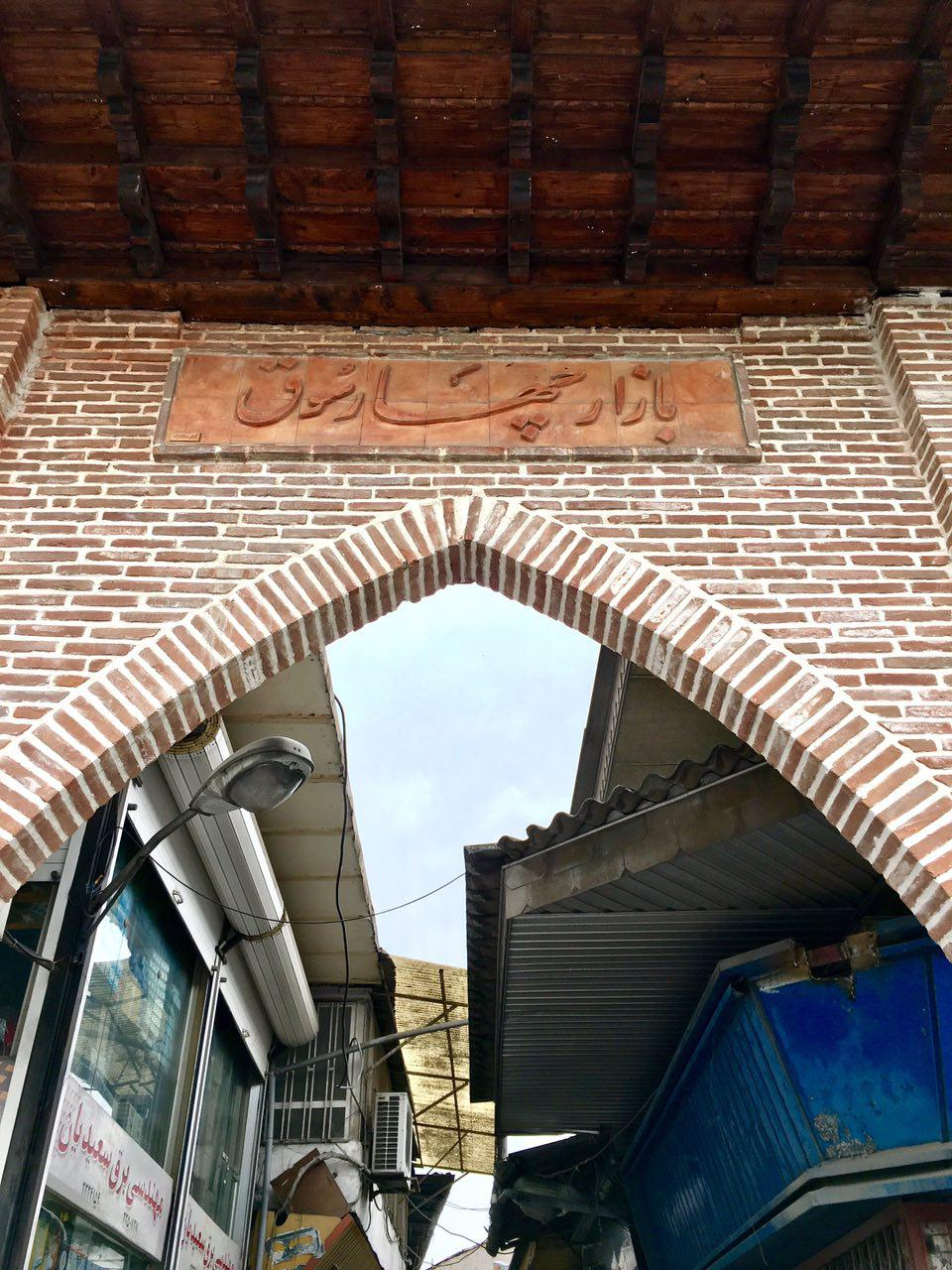
Entrance of Amol Bazaar

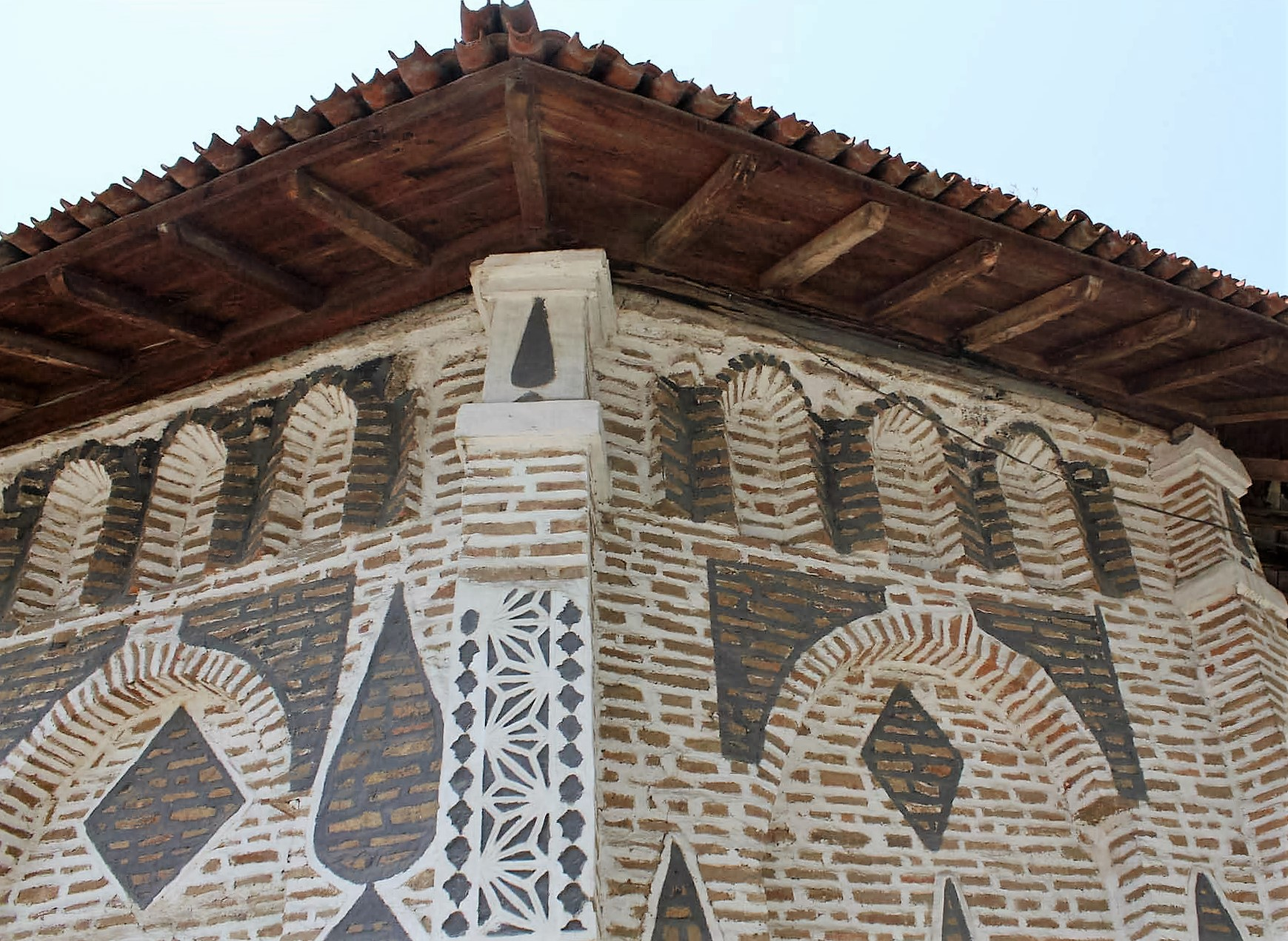
View of Imamzadeh Qasem in old Amol

== Historical and natural attractions ==
In City and County:

- Mount Damavand is a stratovolcano which is the highest peak in Iran and the Middle East. It has a special place in Persian mythology and folklore.
- Mausoleum of Mir Bozorg (Tomb of Qavam al-Din Marashi)
- Lar Dam
- Lar National Park
- Mosque of Hasan al-Utrush Originally a small tomb tower before renovation.
- Sayyid Haydar Amoli (Seyyed Se Tan Tomb tower)
- Moalagh Bridge
- Davazdah Cheshmeh Bridge
- Shahandasht Waterfall
- Amol Bazaar
- Amol History Museum
- Malek Bahman Castle
- Nassereddin Shah relief (known as Shekl-e Shah)
- Jameh Mosque of Amol
- Agha Abbas Mosque
- Kafar Koli Caves
- Yakhi Waterfall
- Deryouk Waterfall
- Shah Abbasi Baths
- Fire Temple of Amol (known as Shams Al-Rasol)
- Imamzadeh Ibrahim
- The Sasanian Road
- Zaman Valley
- Tower Khidr Nabi
- Village forest Blairan
- Village forest Alimastan
- Gol-e Zard Cave
- Manouchehri Mansion
- Shafahi House
- Ab Ask Thermal Springs
- Ashraf Bath
- Inn Kemboja
- Heshtel Towers
- Kahrud Castle
- Sangi Bridge Polour
- Imam Hassan Askari Mosque
- Imamzadeh Qasem Shrine
- Imamzadeh Abdollah Shrine
- Mohammad Taher Shrine
- Ab ask Thermal Springs
- Lake Sahon
- Haj Ali Kochak Mosque
- Ab Murad Waterfall
- Sang Darka Waterfall
- Amoloo Mineral Water Spring
- Forest Park Mirza Kuchak Khan Haraz
- Forest Park Halumsar
- Ziaru Jungle
- Dehkadeh Talaei Park
- Larijan Hot Spring
- Dokhaharan lake
- Hosseiniyeh of Amol
- Plain Shaghayegh Larijan
- Gabri Tower
- Mir-Safi Baths
- Tomb Darvish Sheikh Ismail
- Robat Sangi Polur
- Prairie anemone of Polur
- Haj Ali Arbab House
- Do Berar Peak
- Sahun Lake
- Ancient Hill Qaleh Kesh
- Larijan Thermal Spring
- Rineh Thermal Springs
- Kolakchal Mountain
- Ghoredagh Mountain
- Div Asiyab Spring
- Hand Caves in Larijan
- Tekyeh Firuz Kola
- Amiri Waterfall
- Mahan Waterfall
- Lasem Ab Morad Waterfall
- Pol-e Mun Castle
- Saghanefar Hendu Kola
- Saghanefar Zarrin Kola
- Tomb of Sultan Shahabuddin
- Takyeh Oji Abad
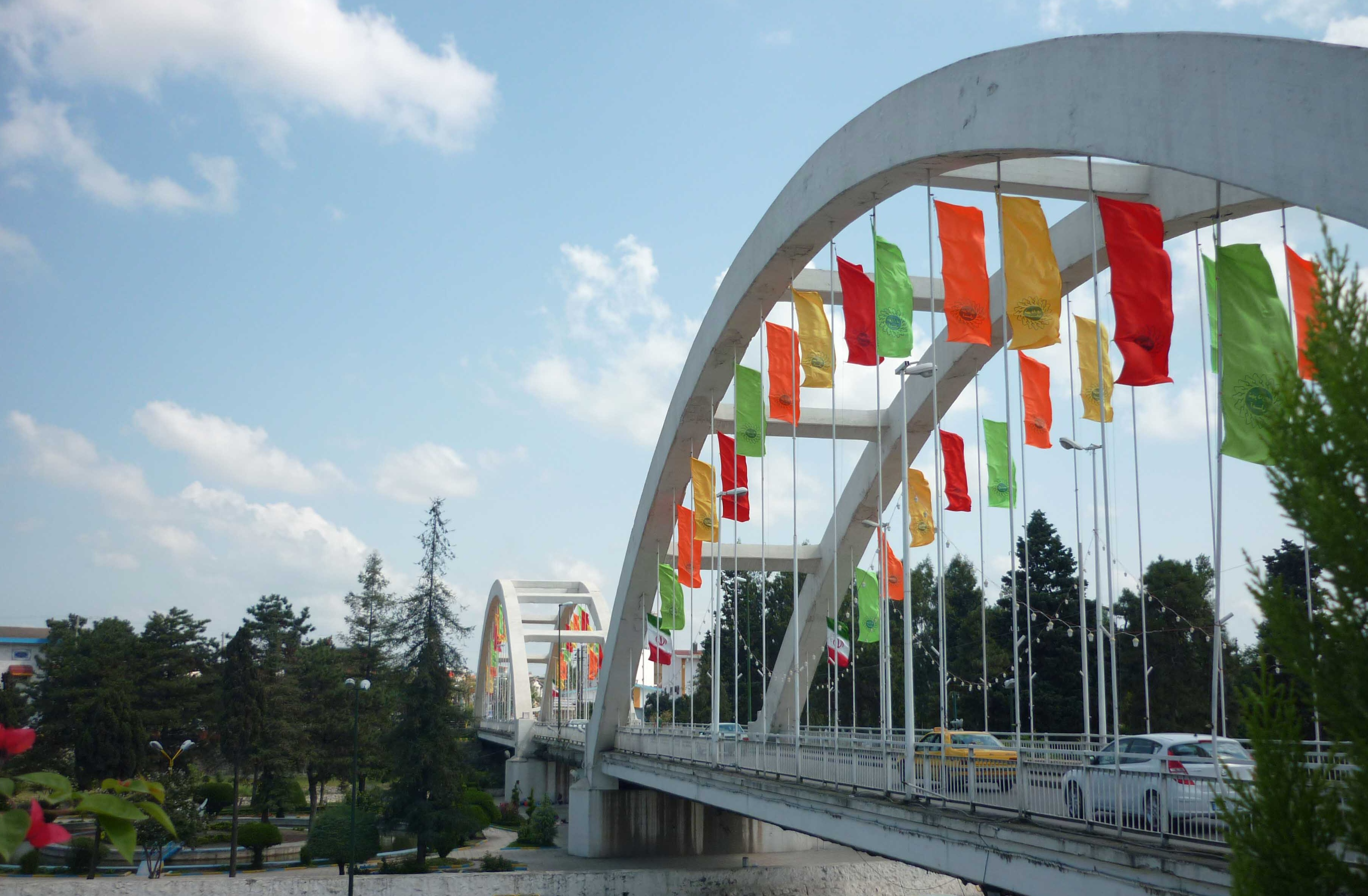
Pol-e No (lit. 'New Bridge'), aka Moalagh Bridge

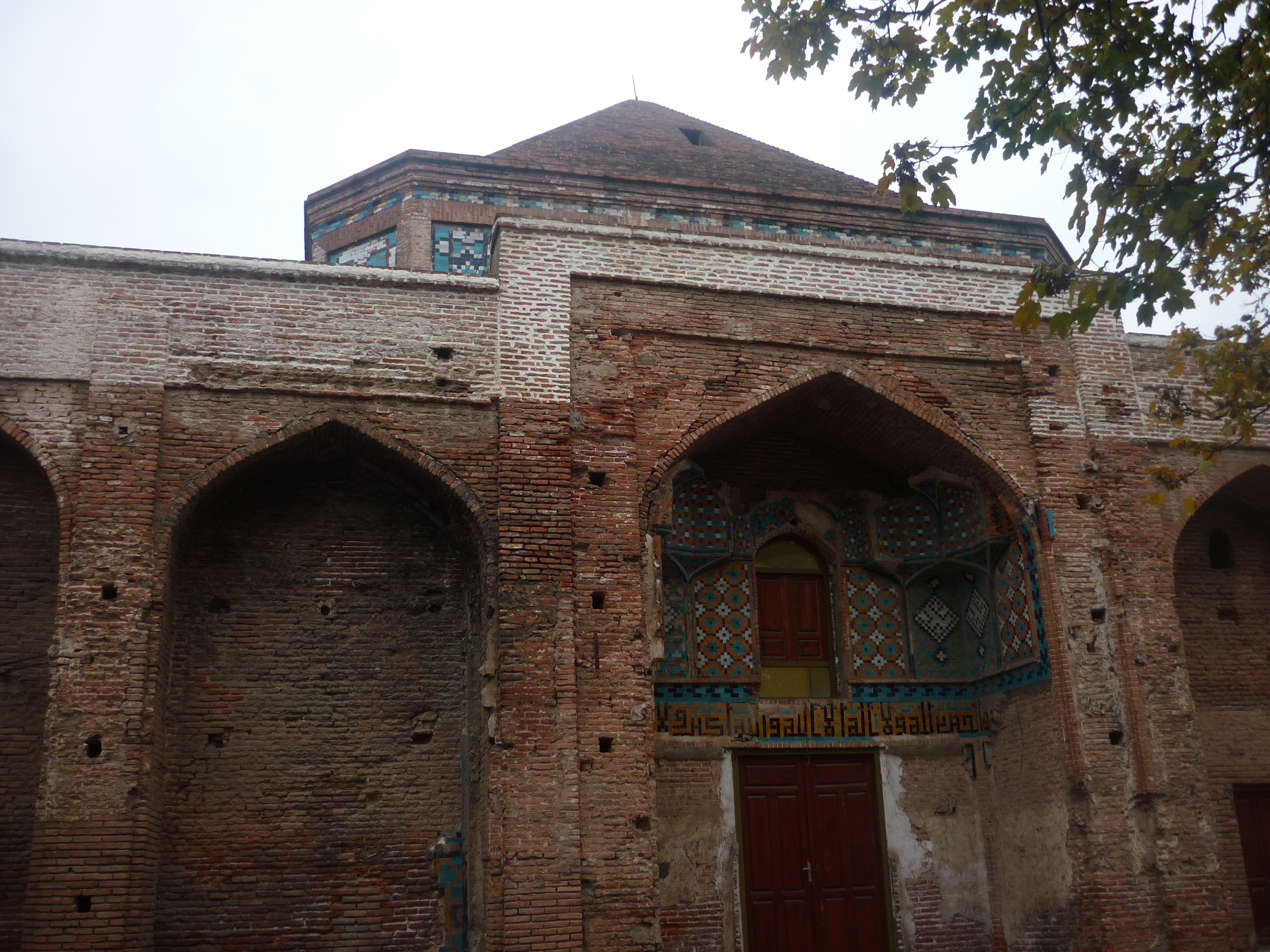
Tomb of Mir-i Buzurg known as Mashad Mir Bozorg

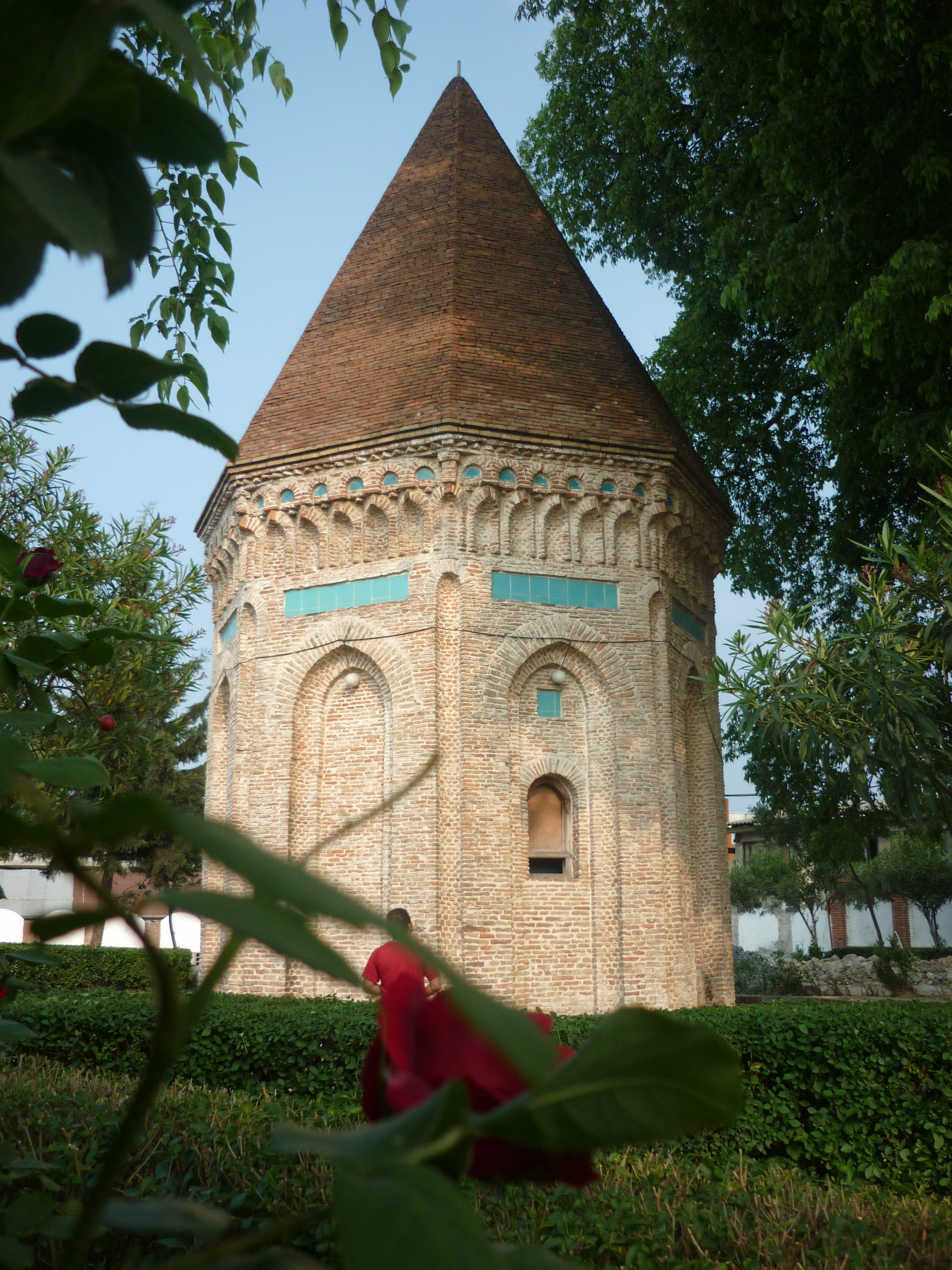
Tomb of Mir Haydar Amuli

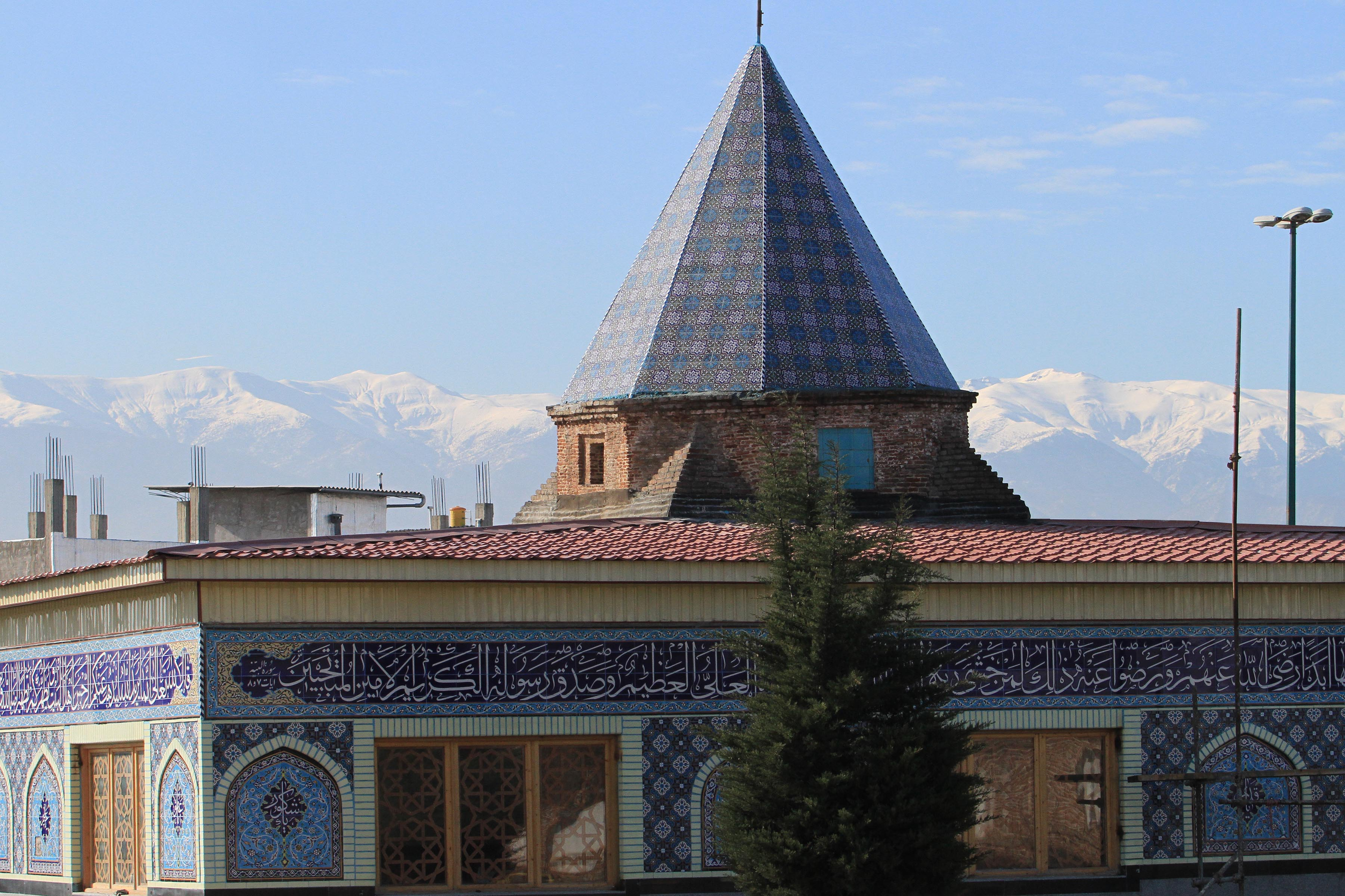
Hasan al-Utrush Nasir-al-hagh tomb

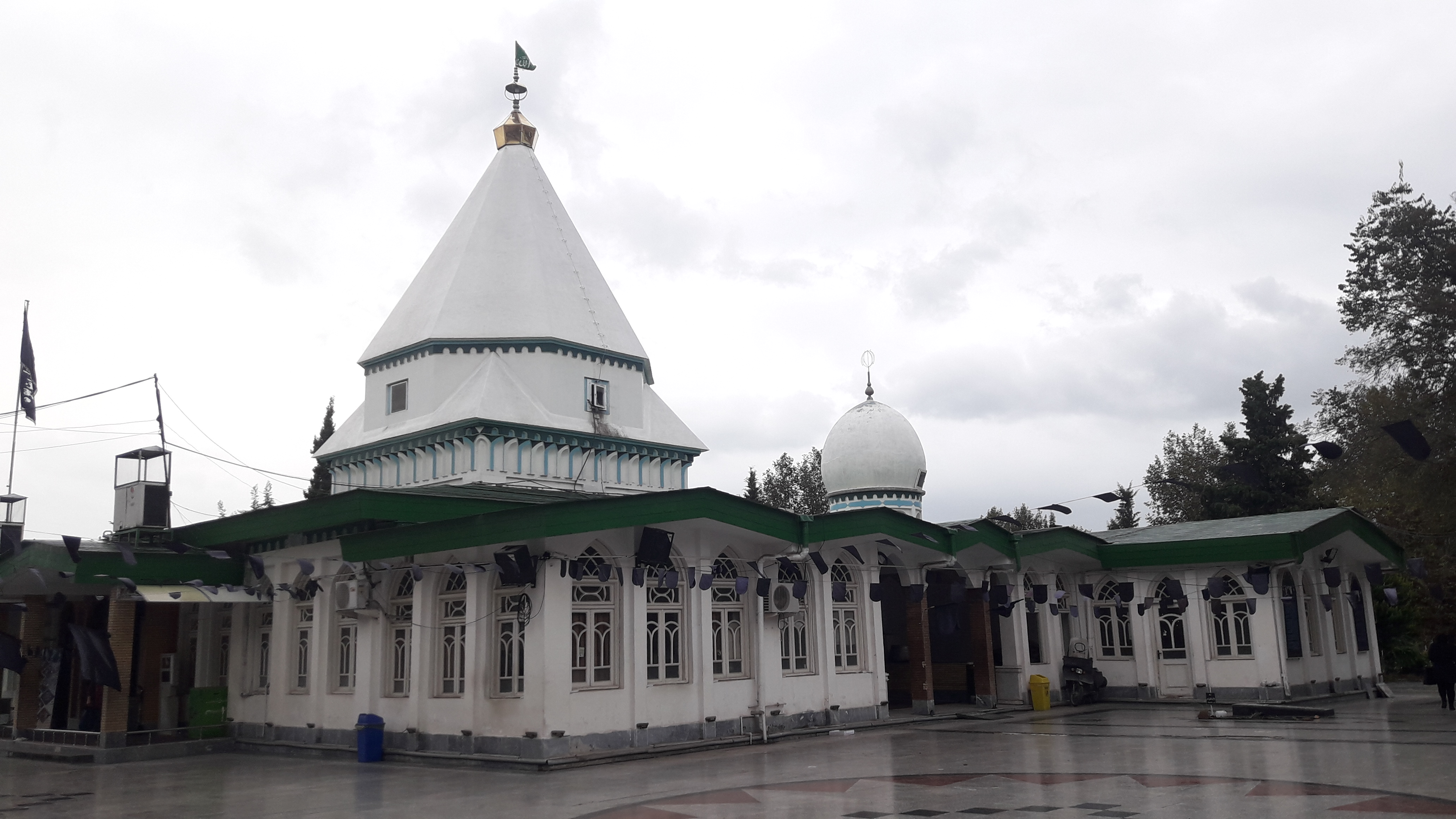
Imamzadeh Ebrahim
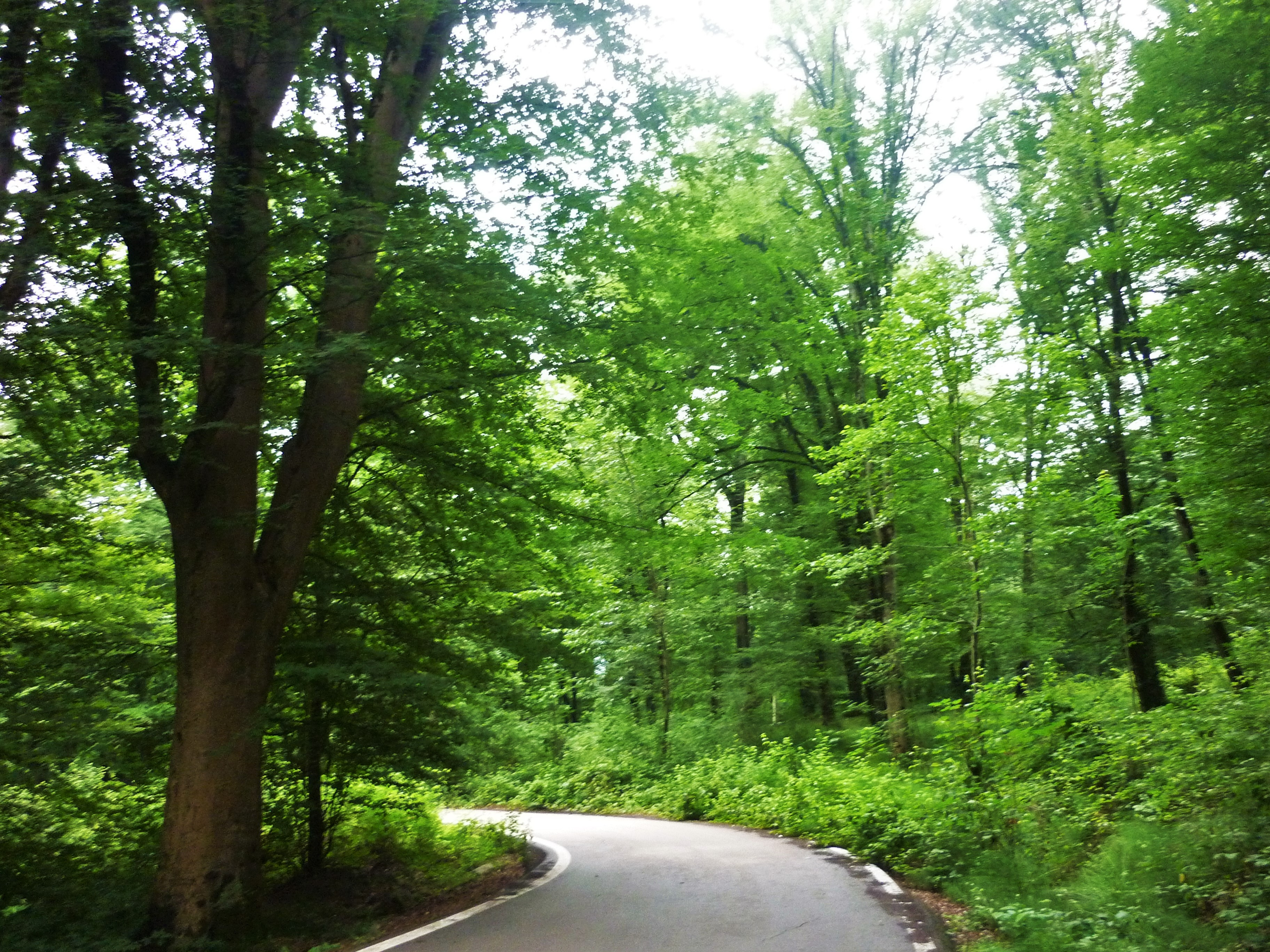
Forest Park

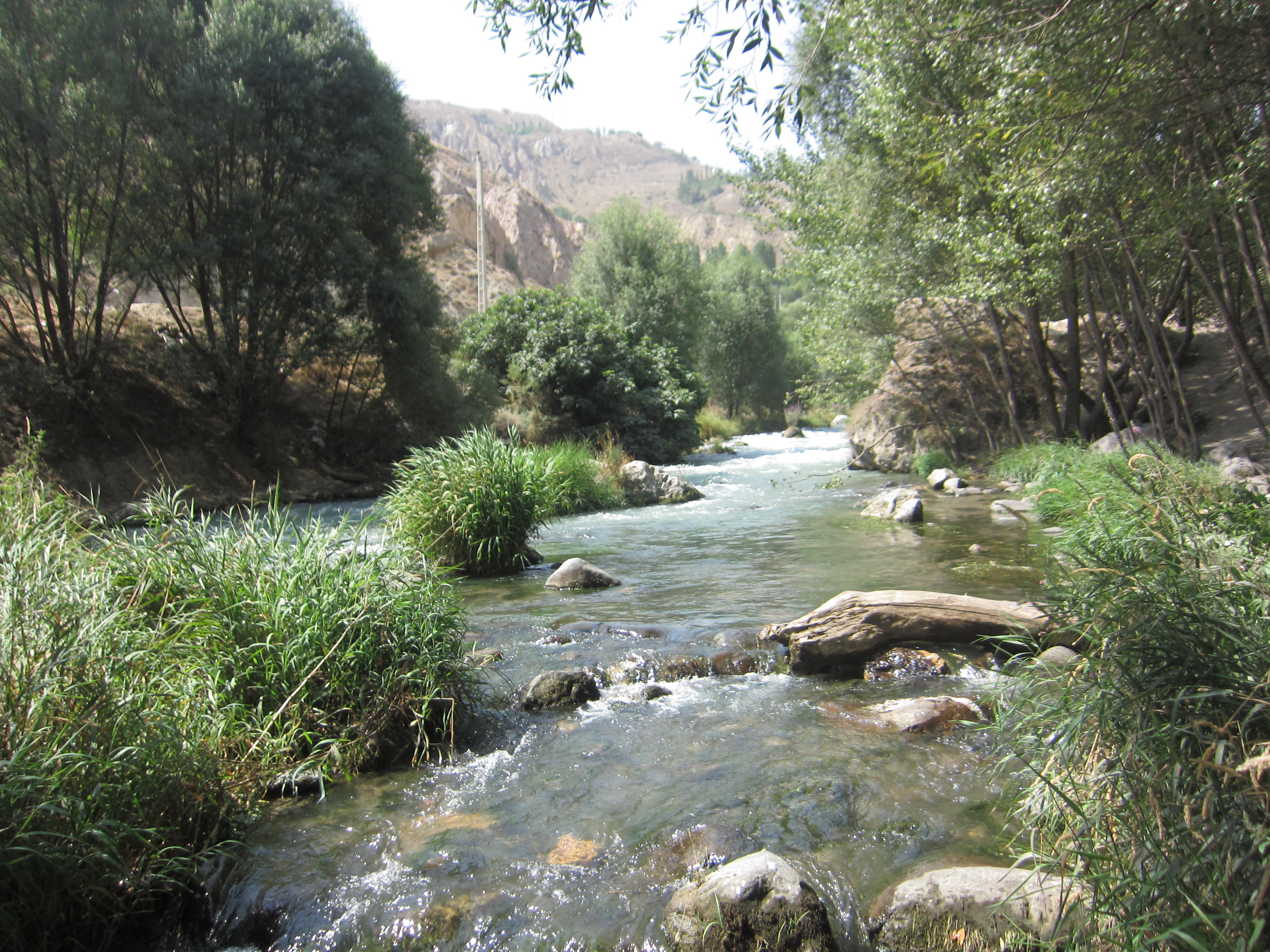
Haraz River

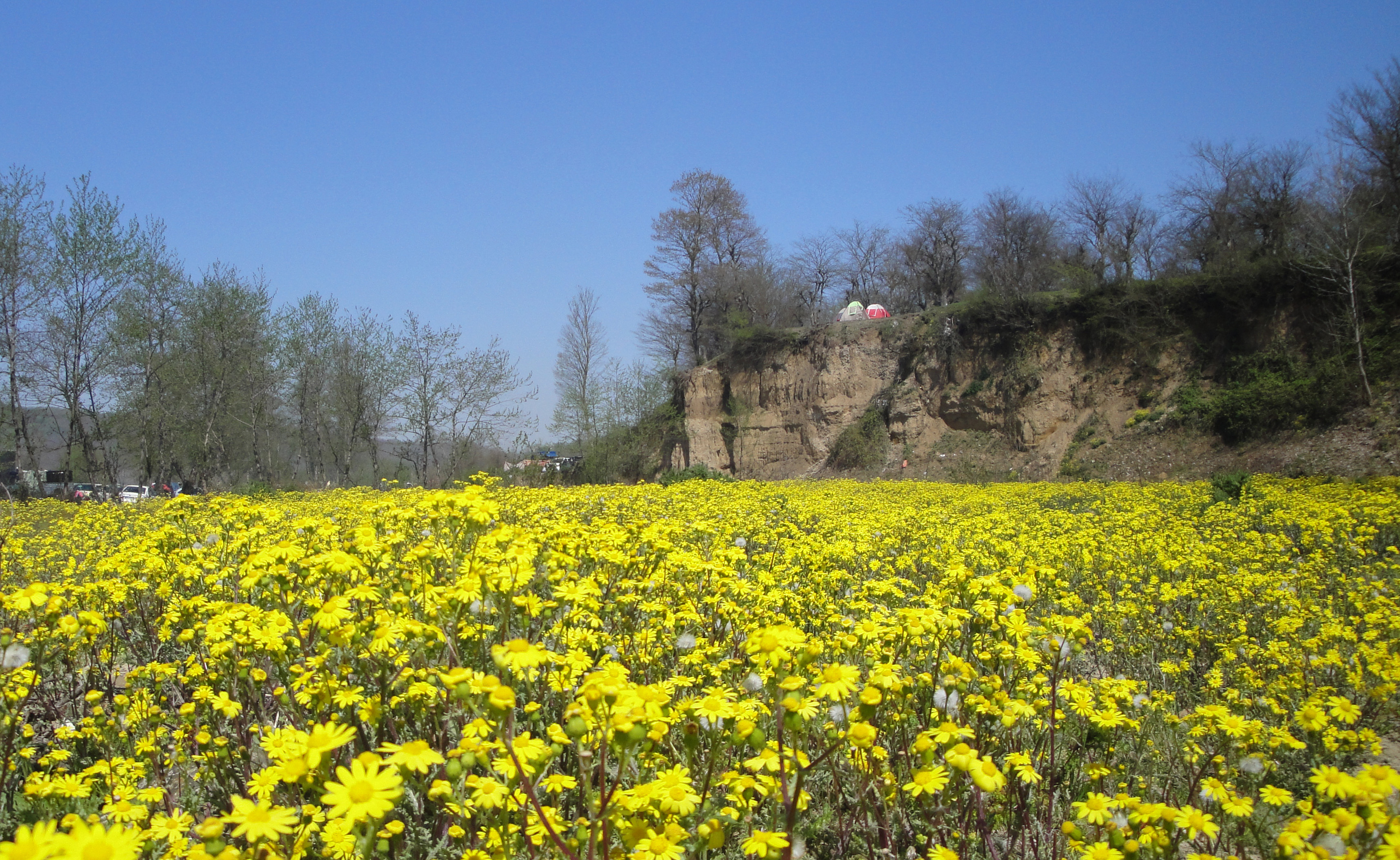
Baliran

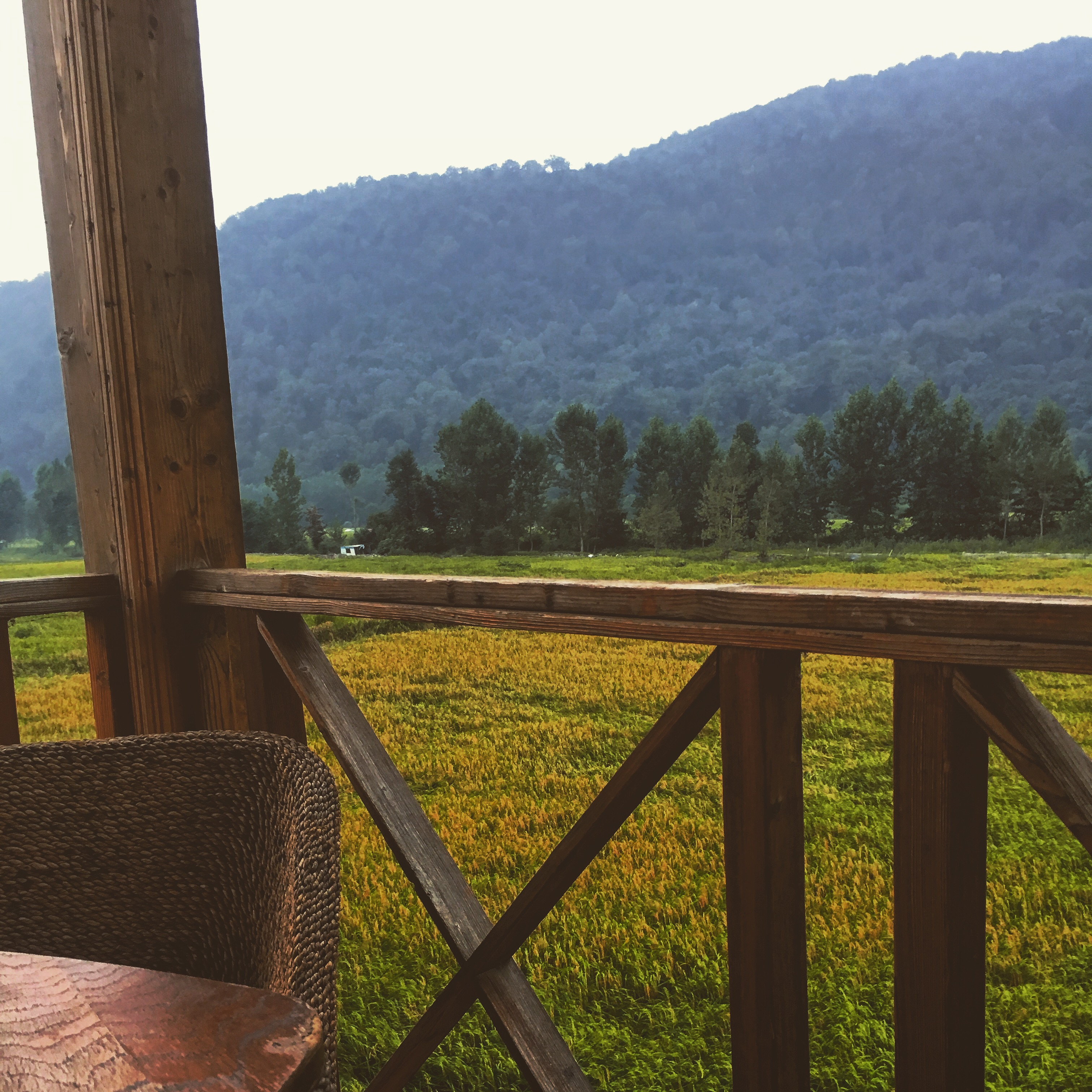
Nature of Amol

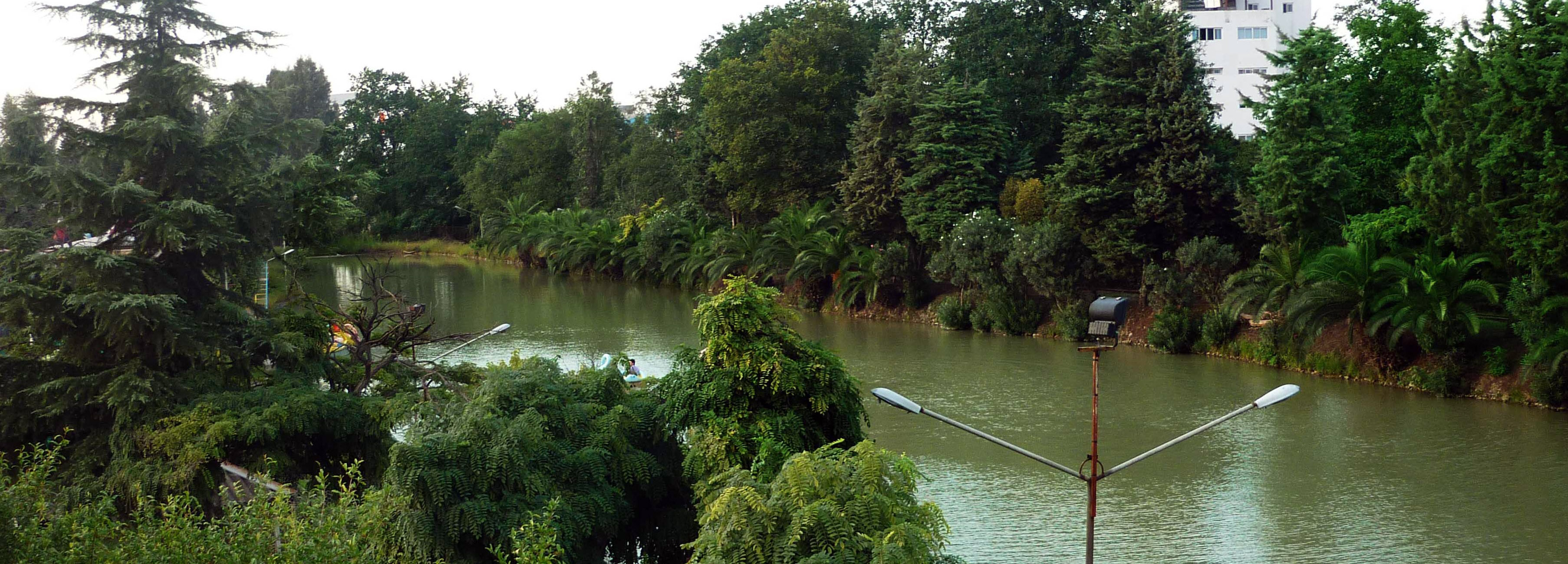
Dehkadeh Talaei Park Lake

=== Lost historic monuments ===
There were many other historic monuments in Amol which have been destroyed throughout history. Here is a list of some of the most famous lost monuments:

- Amol government house (Dar al-Hakuma),
- The dome of Iraj son of Fereydoun,
- The house and bathhouse of Khajeh Yaghoub Majusi,
- Ameleh Palace and Tomb,
- Mashhad Sheikh Abu Turab, Sheikh Zahid Firooi tomb,
- Shrine Hassan ibn Hamza Alavi,
- Shrine of Sharaf al-Din,
- Shahriar Taj al-Dawla shrine,
- Malik Ashtar mosque and minaret,
- Firoozabad palace,
- Fortification Amol,
- Palace Khosrow Parviz,
- Parthian Fortress,
- Chaikhori mansion,
- Qal'eh Dokhtar,
- Afshar Soldiers camp,
- Khalidsara castle,
- Mahaneh Sar castle,
- Kahrud castle,
- Gabri tower,
- Eight caravanserais,
- Six baths,
- Twelve Ab anbar,
- Several mansions and as well as the garden and mansion of Shah Abbas Safavid.

== Souvenir ==
List:

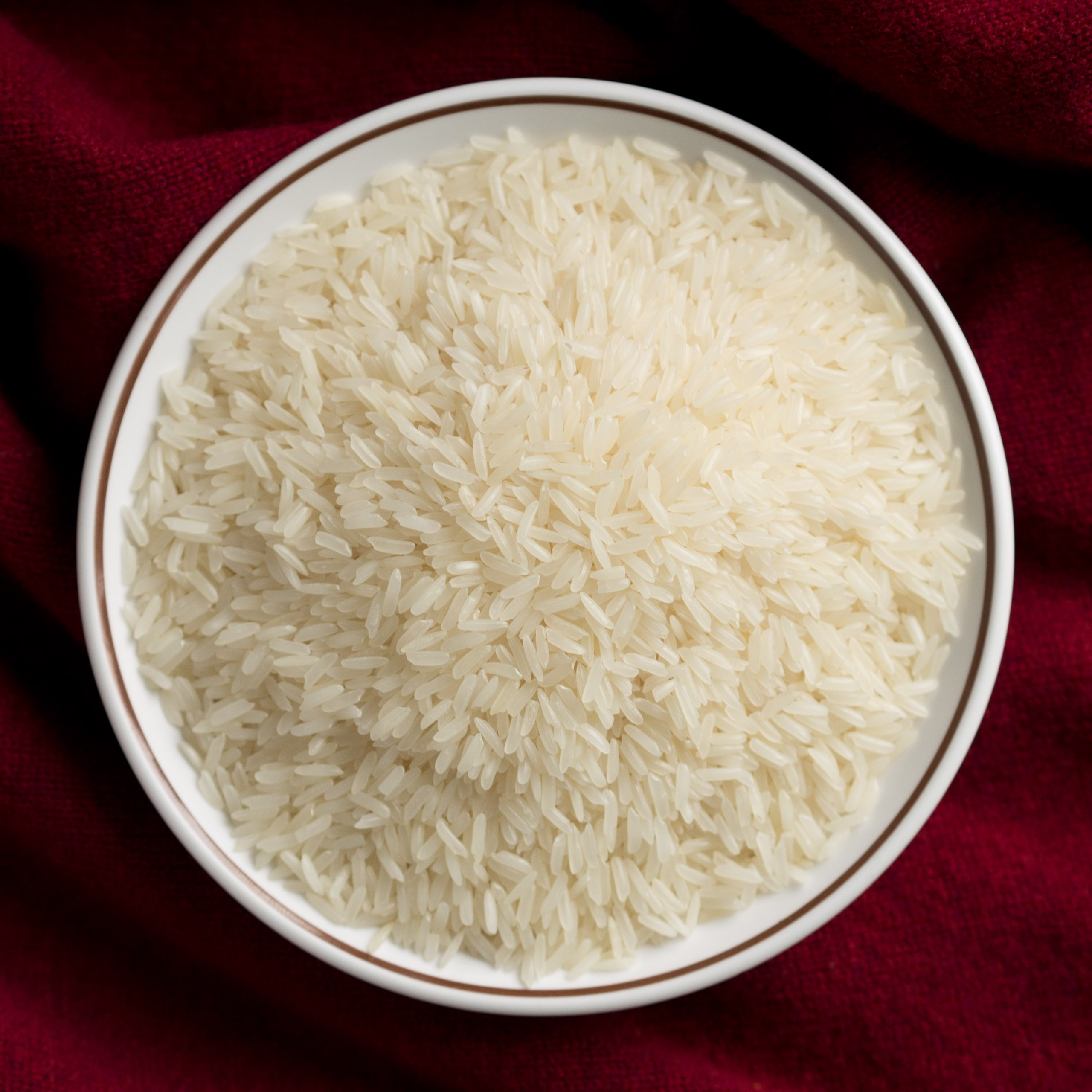
Rice

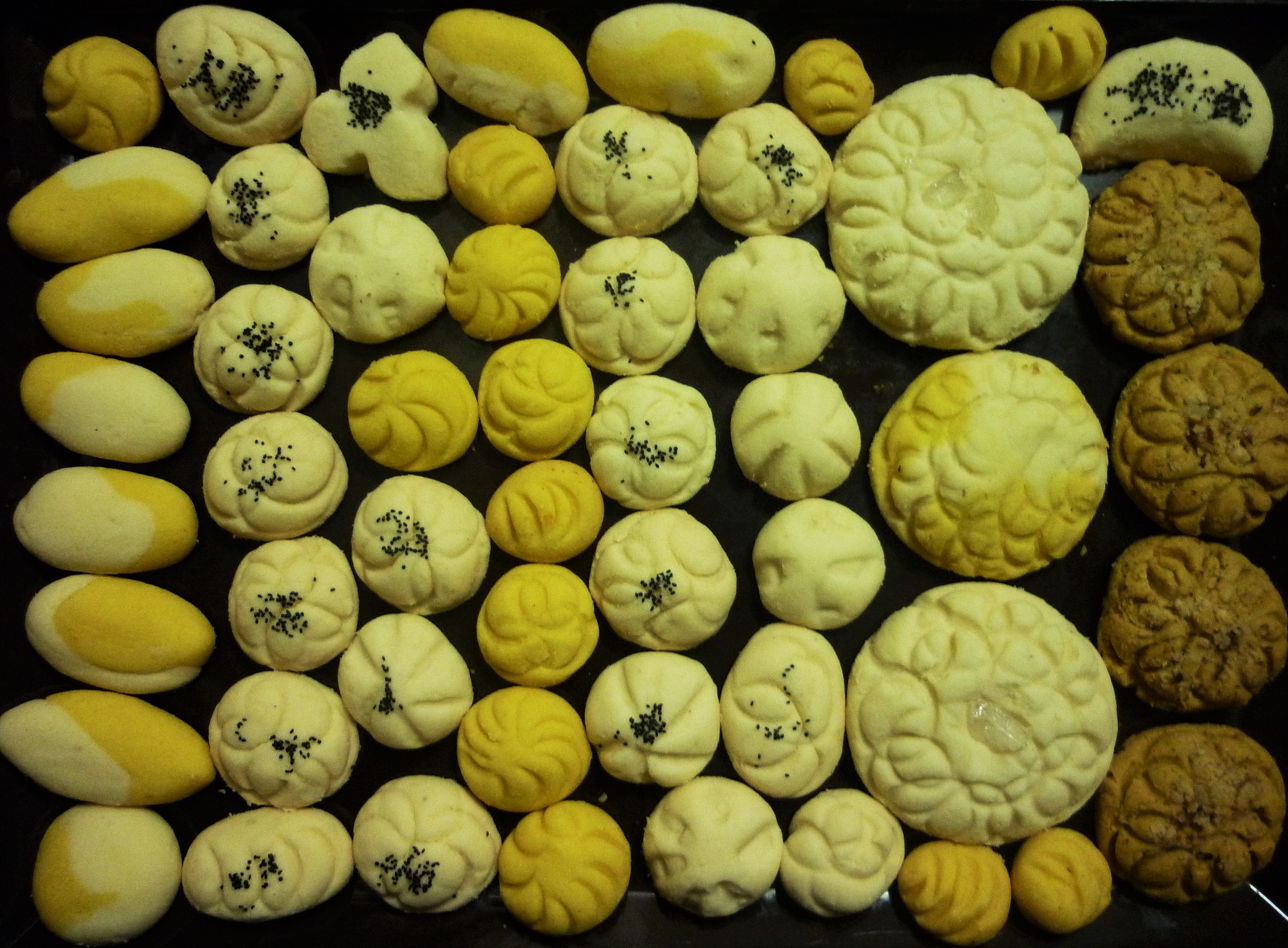
Dissimilar Pastry

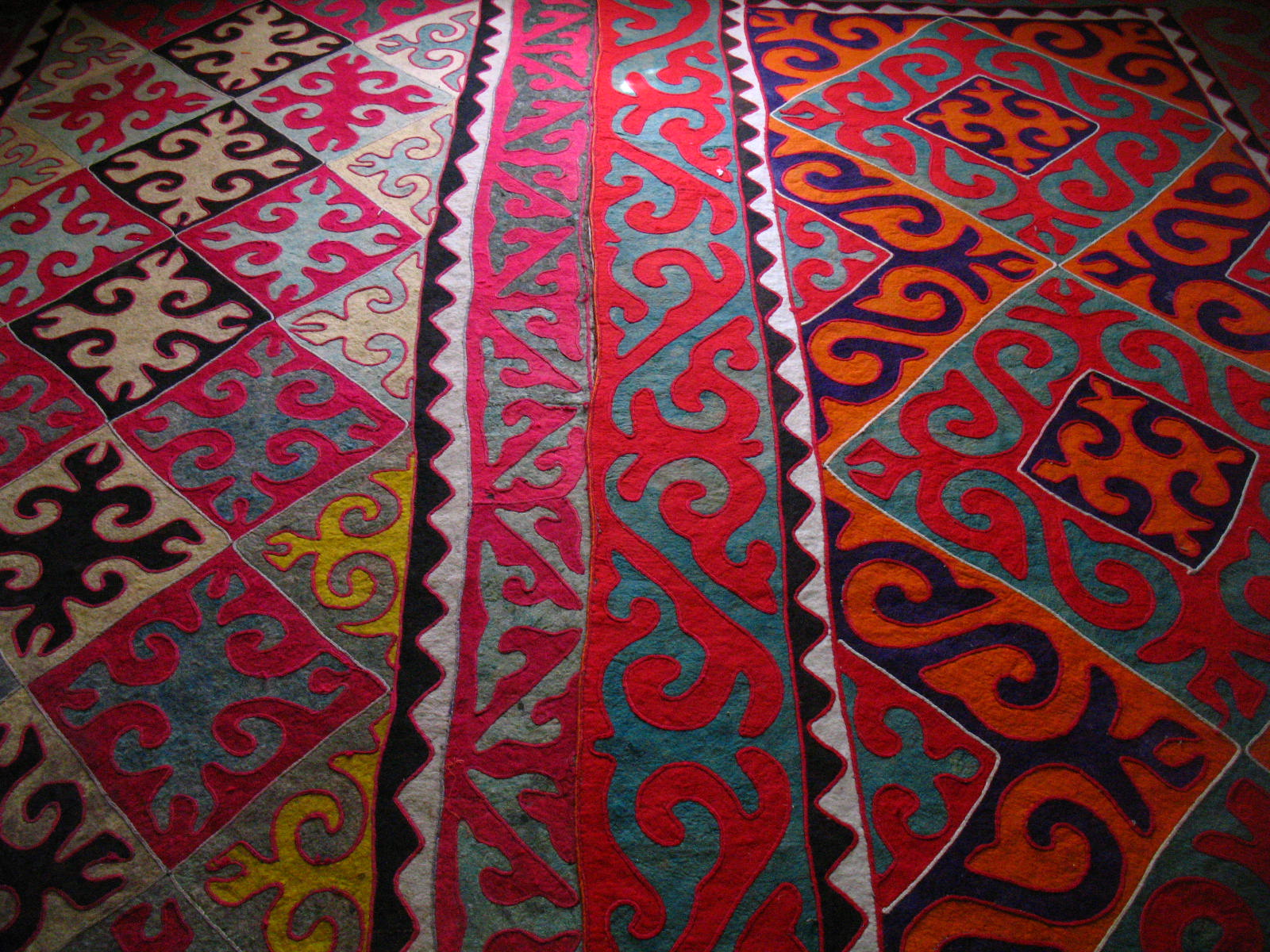
Felt

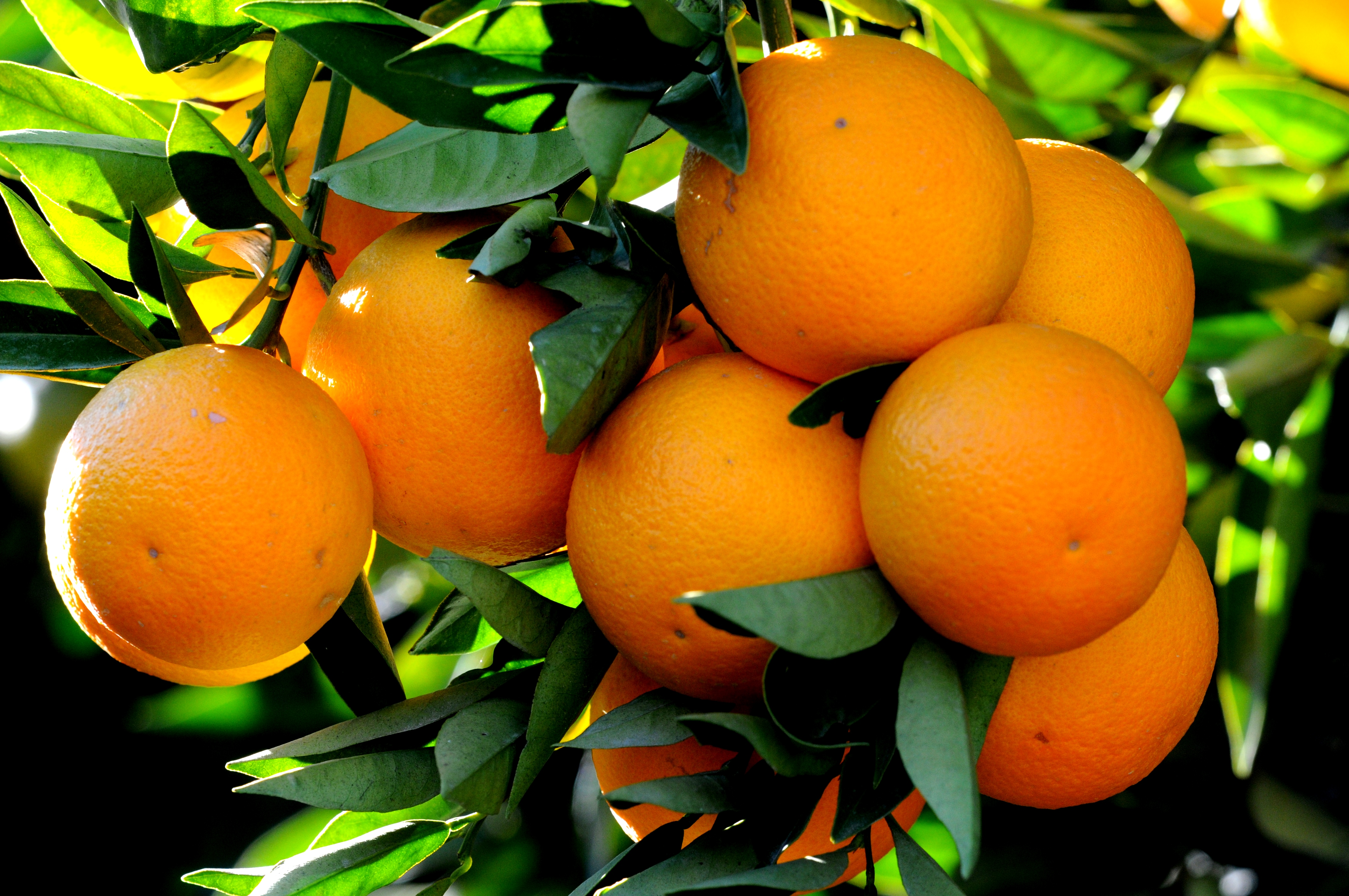
Orange

- Rice (Berenj)
- Tursu (Torshi)
- Vegetable (Sabzi)
- Kilim (Gelim)
- Pottery (Sofalgari)
- Juglans (Gerdoo)
- Orange (Porteghal)
- Cherry (Gilas)
- Apple (Sib)
- Wood carving (Monabat Kari)
- Honey (Asal)
- Felt (Namad)
- Fruit preserves (Murabba)
- Local Bread (Nan Mahali)
- Pastry Ab dandan
- Pastry Aqooz Kennak
- Pastry Saghe aroos
- Naz Khatoon
- Abe Narenj
- Pisgendele
- Yogurt dalal
- Halva native

=== Food ===
- Kateh
- Kabab torsh
- Tah Chin
- Halva
- Peshte Zik
- Alu Mosema
- Morghe Torsh
- Shami Goosht
- Ash-e doogh
- Khoresht Aloo
- Mahi Shekam Por (Stuffed Fish)
- Morgh Shekam Por (Stuffed Chicken)
- Ordak Shekam Por (Stuffed Duck)
- Ispina-Saek
- Ashure

== Transportation ==
=== Air base ===
Amol is an air base with two helicopters relief Hilal Ahmar. This is the first center of Iran's air rescue.

=== By rail ===
In 1886, during the reign of Naser al-Din Shah Qajar, an 8.7 km 1,000 mm (3 ft 3 3/8 in) metre gauge horse-driven suburban railway was established south of Tehran, which was later converted to steam. This line was closed in 1952. The First Iranian railway was set up in 1887 between Mahmudabad and Amol; its construction was completely private. However, it was not used because of several problems. In the modern times, fast train from north, Tehran to Amol started in 2013 and stopped working in 2020.

=== By car and bus ===
Amol has the largest urban boulevard and highways within Mazandaran. In the city there are five bus terminals. Terminal International Firuzi is the largest terminal in North of Iran. There is an extensive bus route throughout the entire municipality as well as numerous public and private taxi services.

=== Road ===
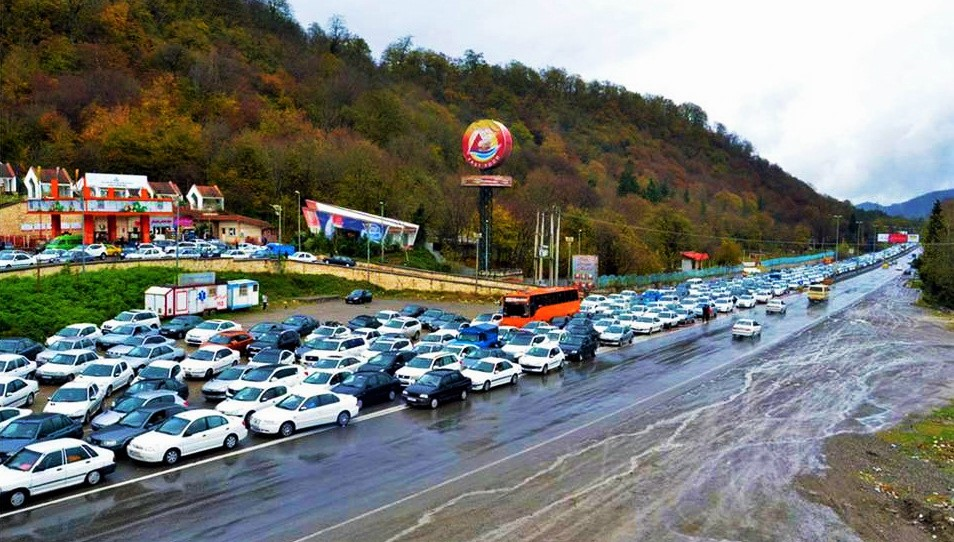
Haraz Road

Haraz Road (Road 77) is the most important road from Tehran to northern Iran (province of Mazandaran) besides Karaj-Chaloos. This road passes from the valley of Haraz river and therefore is also known as Haraz Road between Amol and Rudehen. Haraz road is the nearest road to Mount Damavand, the highest peak in Iran and Middle East. Lar National Park is accessible via this road. The road is the shortest route from Tehran to the north (180 km). In recent years, some parts of the road have been widened and safety has been improved. The ancient road is part of the Haraz road near Vana where ancient relics of the Old Road to Amol are visible. The road was replaced by the Veresk Road. Amol is the city with the largest boulevards and highways of Mazandaran. Haraz International Road is one of Iran's most important roads to Amol, which connects other cities to northern Iran. Roads such as Amol-Babol, Amol-Mahmoudabad (Coastal Road), Amol-Fereydunkenar and Amol-Noor can also be reached.

=== Streets and boulevards ===
- Haraz Street
- Imam Reza Street
- Taleb Amoli Boulevard
- Ayatollah Taleghani Boulevard
- Nour Street
- Mahdieh Street
- Enghelab Street
- Janbazan Street
- Monfared Niyaki Boulevard
- Ayatollah Modarres Boulevard
- Yousefian Boulevard
- Muhammad ibn Jarir Tabari Street
- 17 Shahrivar Street
- Basij Boulevard
- Laleh Street
- Farhang Street
- Amin Tabarsi Boulevard
- Shahid Beheshti Street
- Mostafa Khomeini Street
- Pasdaran Street
- Azadegan Boulevard
- Velayat Boulevard
- Motahhari Boulevard
- Hilal Ahmar Street
- Shahid Ghassemi Boulevard
- Resalat Street
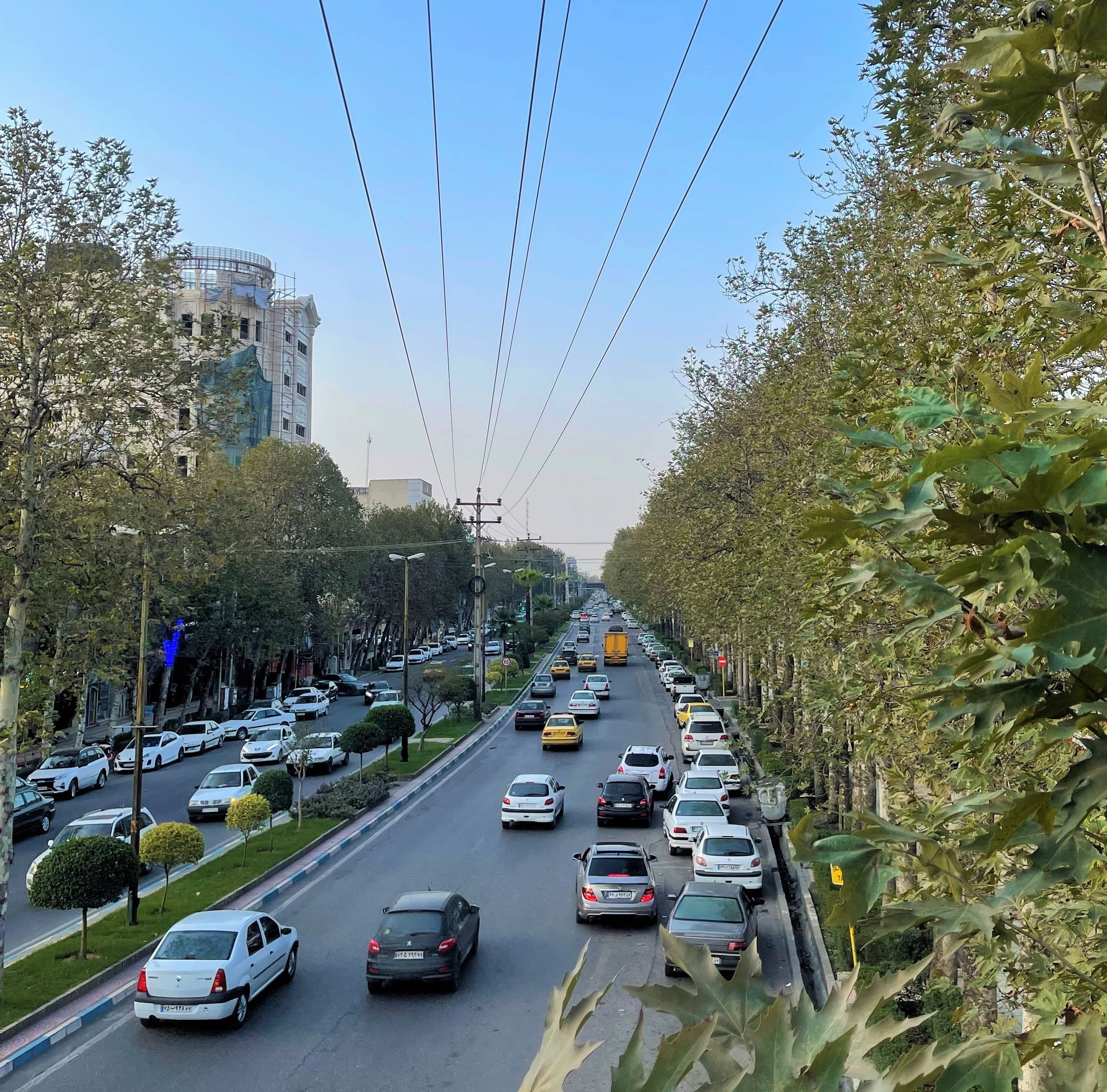
View of Haraz Street (Summer season)

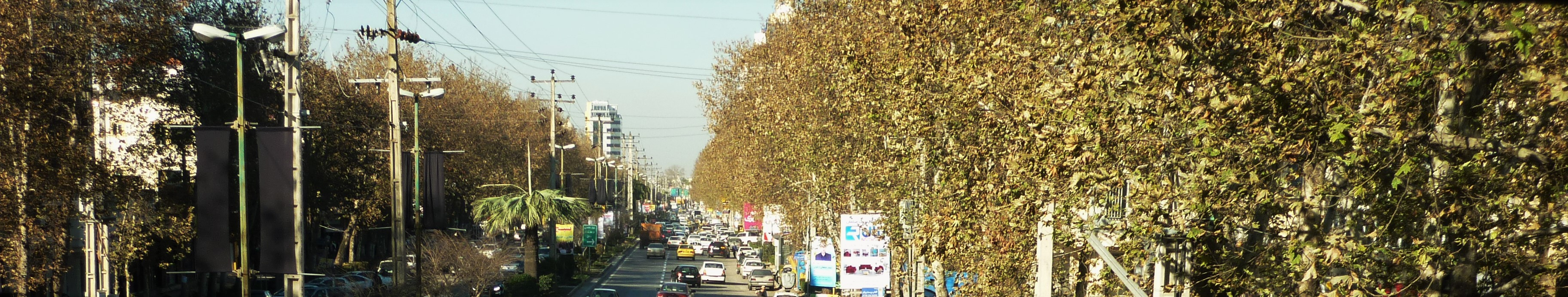
View of Haraz Street (Winter season)

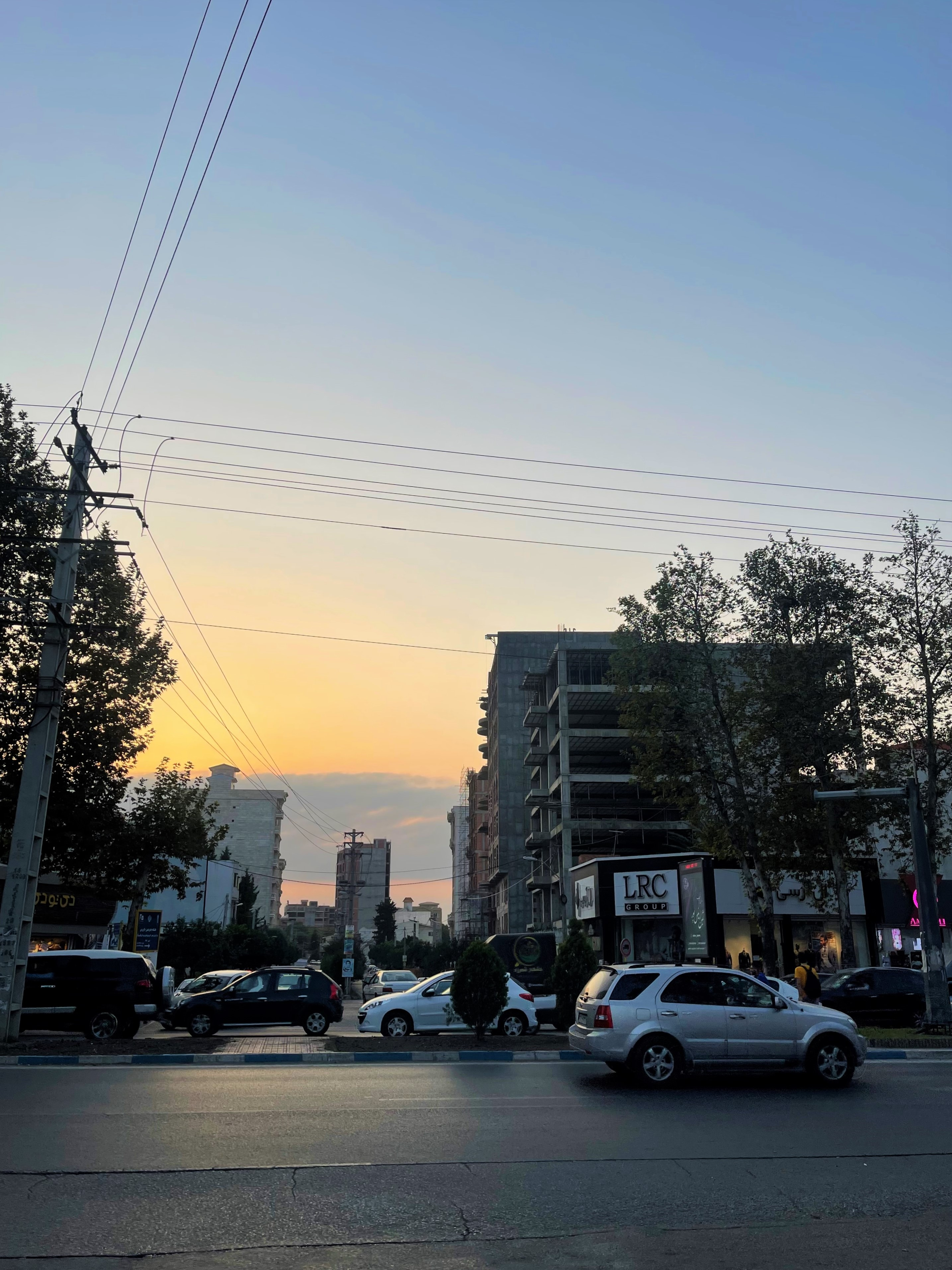
Haraz Street

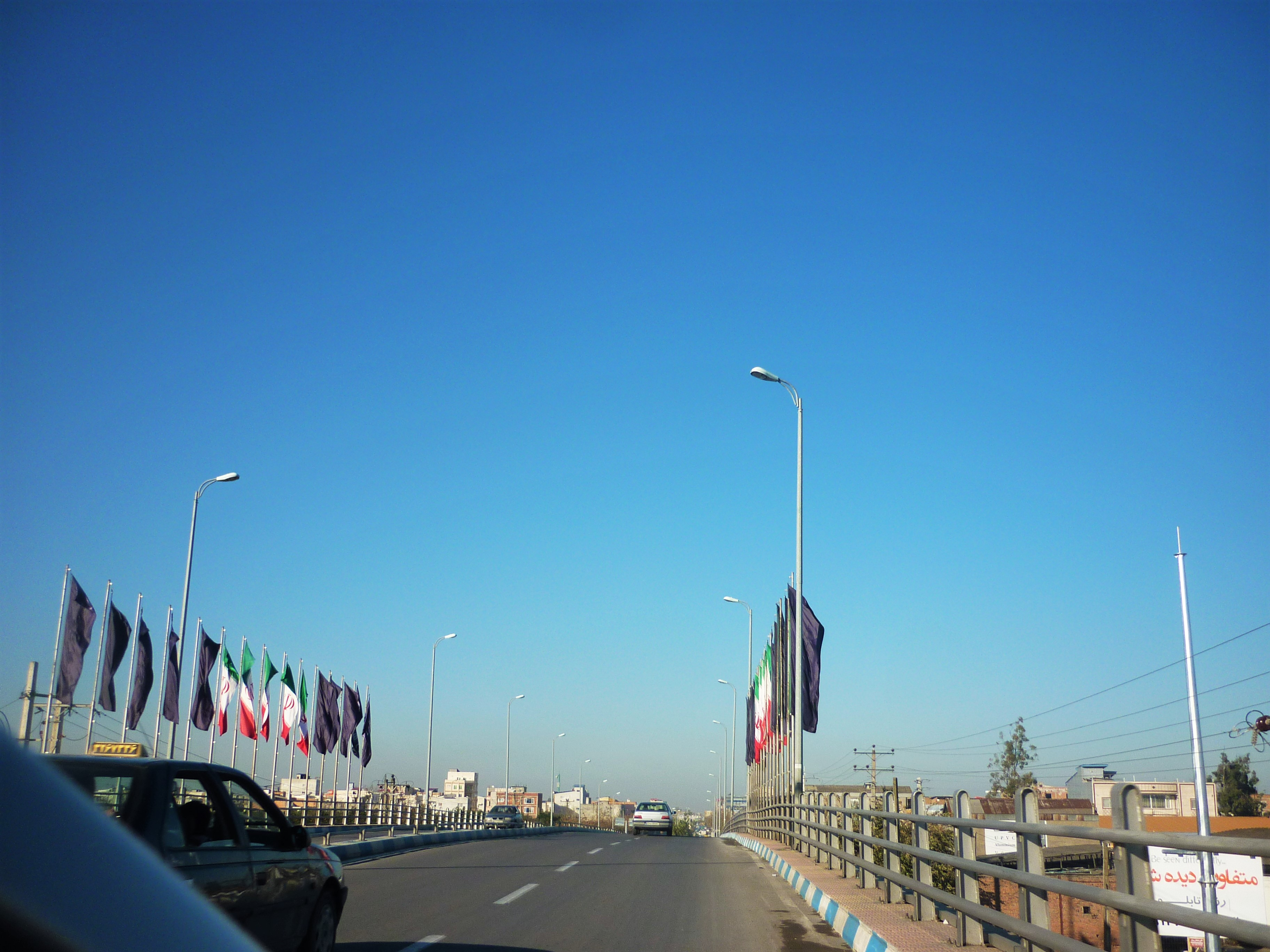
Taleb Amoli Boulevard bridge

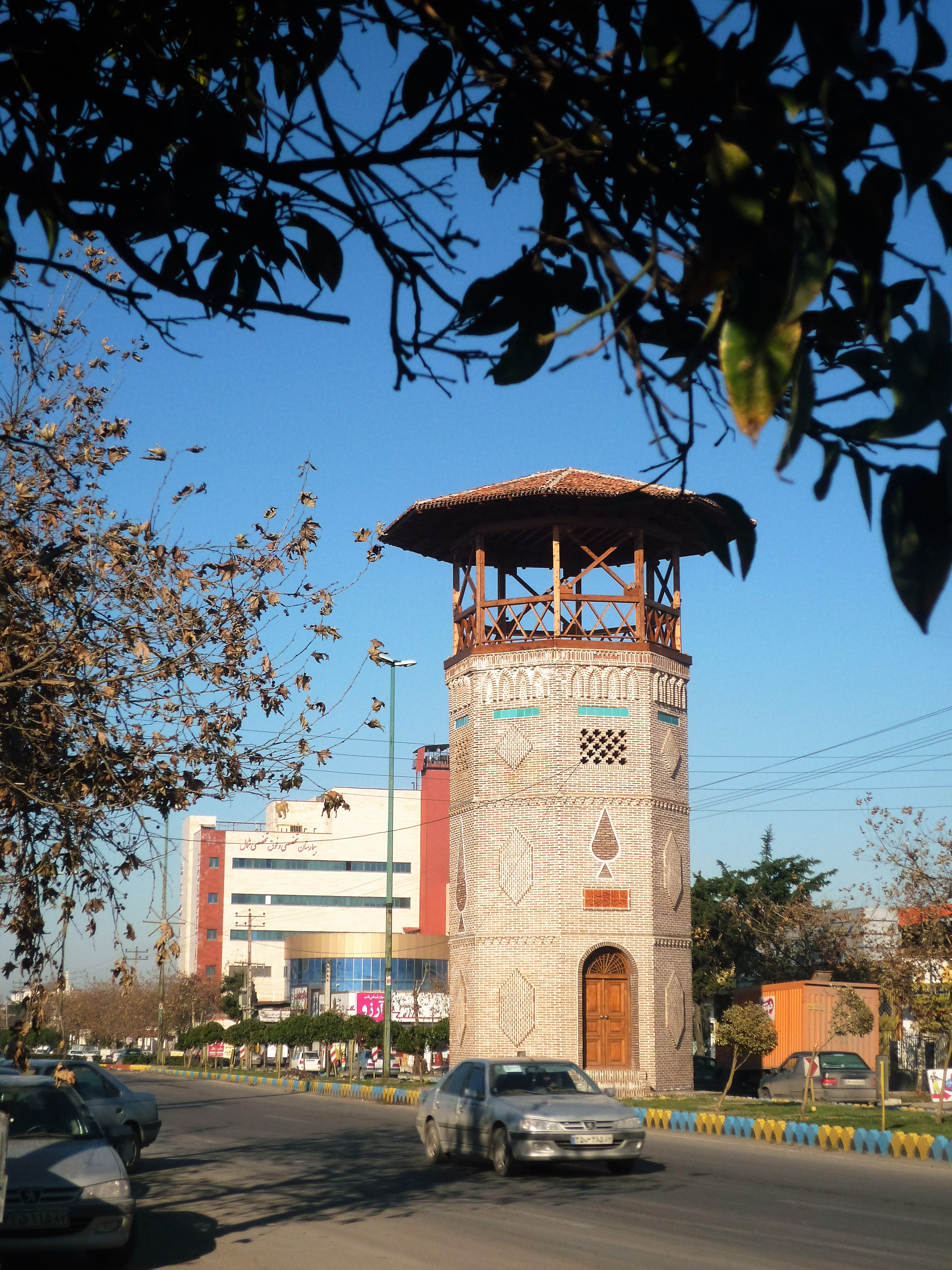
Modarres Boulevard - Entrance to the city from Tehran

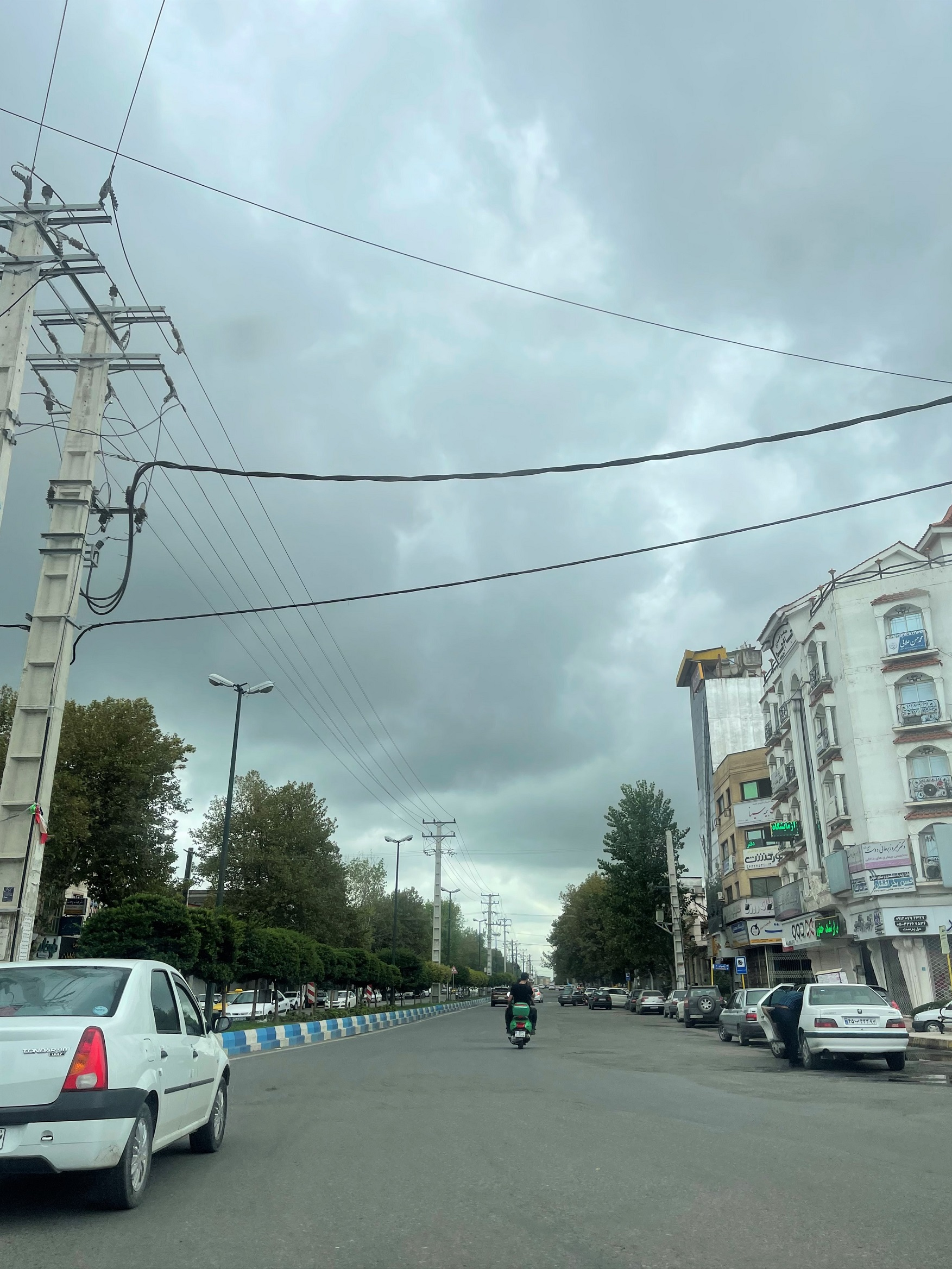
Imam Reza Street

== Customs ==
In the old days, there was a large international port, which was a major trading port in northern Iran. It has become the city of Mahmoudabad (Ahlam). Now Amol Customs is being operated as part of Central Customs. It is located in the city of Amol and Amol products are exported to other cities under the supervision of Amol under water, land and air borders.

== Science ==
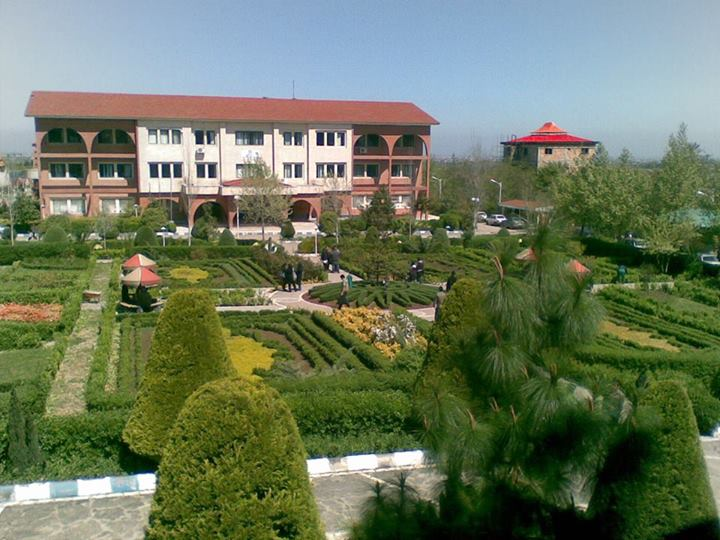
Shomal University

In the third to ninth centuries, Amol had 70 Khanqah and universities. In the 11th century, Nizam al-Mulk recommended in the Siyasatnama the creation of the Nizamiyyas, modern institutions with academic status in the large cities of the Islamic world, such as Balkh, Baghdad, Damascus, Nishapur and Bukhara. The name of Amol was also included among them. Most of the Allameh of Iran are born in this city. Also the first seminary by Hasan al-Utrush was built in Amol, which was later named Imam Hassan Askari Mosque. Amol at various times was the center of science and culture in Iran, for example, Abu Sa'id Abu'l-Khayr, Muhammad ibn Zakariya al-Razi, Nasir al-Din al-Tusi and Avicenna. Three great men of Iran so-named Polymath respectively students Abul-Abbas Qassab Amoli, Ali ibn Sahl Rabban al-Tabari, Siraj Qumri and Abu Abdullah Al-Natili all three were born and residents of Amol. Also great historian of the world Muhammad ibn Jarir al-Tabari, was from Amol. Today likewise, scientific centers such as universities and schools and scientific congresses are active in the city. This branch of Pasteur Institute of Iran is located in the city of Amol in the state of Mazandaran. This institute comprises different departments. Amol with University of Special Modern Technologies and Tehran with Tehran University of Medical Sciences hosted the Special Modern Technologies USERN.

=== Colleges and universities ===
Some of the biggest universities of Iran such as Shomal University are situated in Amol.

Amol has three universities:

- Shomal University (Non-profit University)
- Amol University of Special Modern Technologies (The first state University of Amol)
- Islamic Azad University, Science and Research Amol Branch (One of The big University Middle East in terms of Area)
- Aban Haraz Institute of Higher Education
- Amol University
- Mazandaran 5 (University of Applied Science and Technology UAST)
- Sabz Institute of Higher Education
- PNU Amol (Payame Noor University)
- Sama College
- Nursing and Paramedical (University of Medical Sciences)
- Pasteur Institute, Iran of Amol
- College of Samangan
- Applied Science Center Fza
- Amol Tohid girls College
- Allameh Hasanzadeh Amoli College
- University of Quranic Sciences
- Farhangian University at Amol

=== Schools ===
In Amol, the first new school was established in Niaki neighborhood next to Seyed Hassan Attar residential house, owned by Shir Mohammad Ali Gazaneh, with three classrooms called the Islamic National School. They were able to sign a contract with two brothers, Haji Khan and Mahmoud Khan Golpayegani. The school was opened and started with the management of Haji Khan and Mahmoud Khan's teacher in 1904, one year before the victory of the Persian Constitutional Revolution. Other schools were built during the Pahlavi era, such as Malekzadeh High School, Farhang School, Shahdookht School, Iran Girls' Elementary School, Nusrat School, Shariatzadeh School, Tabari High School, Danesh national primary School and Pahlavi High School. Pahlavi High School that's today is known as Imam Khomeini High School, it was built in 1934 by German architecture engineers. The school was in 2019 registered to Iran National Heritage List.

== Sport ==
Wrestling, Volleyball, Handball, Futsal, Basketball, Boxing, Race car, Mountaineering, Bodybuilding, Karate, Taekwondo and Kung Fu Popular sports in Amol. Kalleh Mazandaran is a volleyball club based in Amol, Asian Club Champions 2013, currently competing in the highest tier of the Iranian volleyball classification, the Iranian Volleyball Super League. Kalleh a Most Popular in Iran and Asia. Kalleh Sports Club also has a basketball team named Kalleh Basketball and Young team volleyball named Kalleh Javan.

=== Wrestling and volleyball ===
Amol is the birthplace of many popular Wrestlers and Volleyball athletes. Notable Athlete from Amol include like, Ghasem Rezaei Olympic gold and bronze medalist and Adel Gholami player in national team.

=== Club ===
Club	Sport	League
Kalleh Mazandaran	Volleyball	Super League
Labaniat Haraz Amol	Volleyball	Super League
Ghand Katrin F.C.	Futsal	Super League
Fouladin Zob	Wrestling	Premier Wrestling League
Fouladin Zob	Weightlifting	Premier Weightlifting League
Damavand Amol	Association football	3rd Division
Kalleh Mazandaran BC	Basketball	IBSL Super League
Raad Padafand Amol	Handball	Premier Handball League
Heyat Badminton Amol	Badminton	Badminton Premier League
Shahrvand Amol	Basketball	Wheelchair Premier League
Veterans & Disabled Amol	Volleyball	Women's Sitting Premier League
F.C Shahin Amol	Association football	Junior Premier League
Amol Football Association	Futsal	Women's Premier League

=== Stadium ===
- Payambar Azam Arena
- Chamran Stadium
- Kalleh Stadium

=== Host ===
- 2007 WAFF Futsal Championship
- West Asian Basketball Championship
- International Fajr Chess Championships 2018
- International Conference of Sport Science 2017
- FIVB Volleyball Coaches Course Level II held in Iran 2018
- Asia Chess Championship 2017

== Media and Cinema ==
Many newspapers and publications were published from Amol since the constitution was a major strength in Mazandaran province. Now, several newspapers and weekly print are active. The first newspaper in Amol was in the name of Mazandaran. Lesan Mellat and Shamshir Mellat was first printed in 1949.

There are 3 cinemas. Farhang Cinema was the first Amol cinema to be built by Ebrahim Monfared in 1952 with a capacity of 200 seats. Moulin Rouge, Metropole and Arash are the other cinemas in the city that were built before the revolution.

== In literature ==
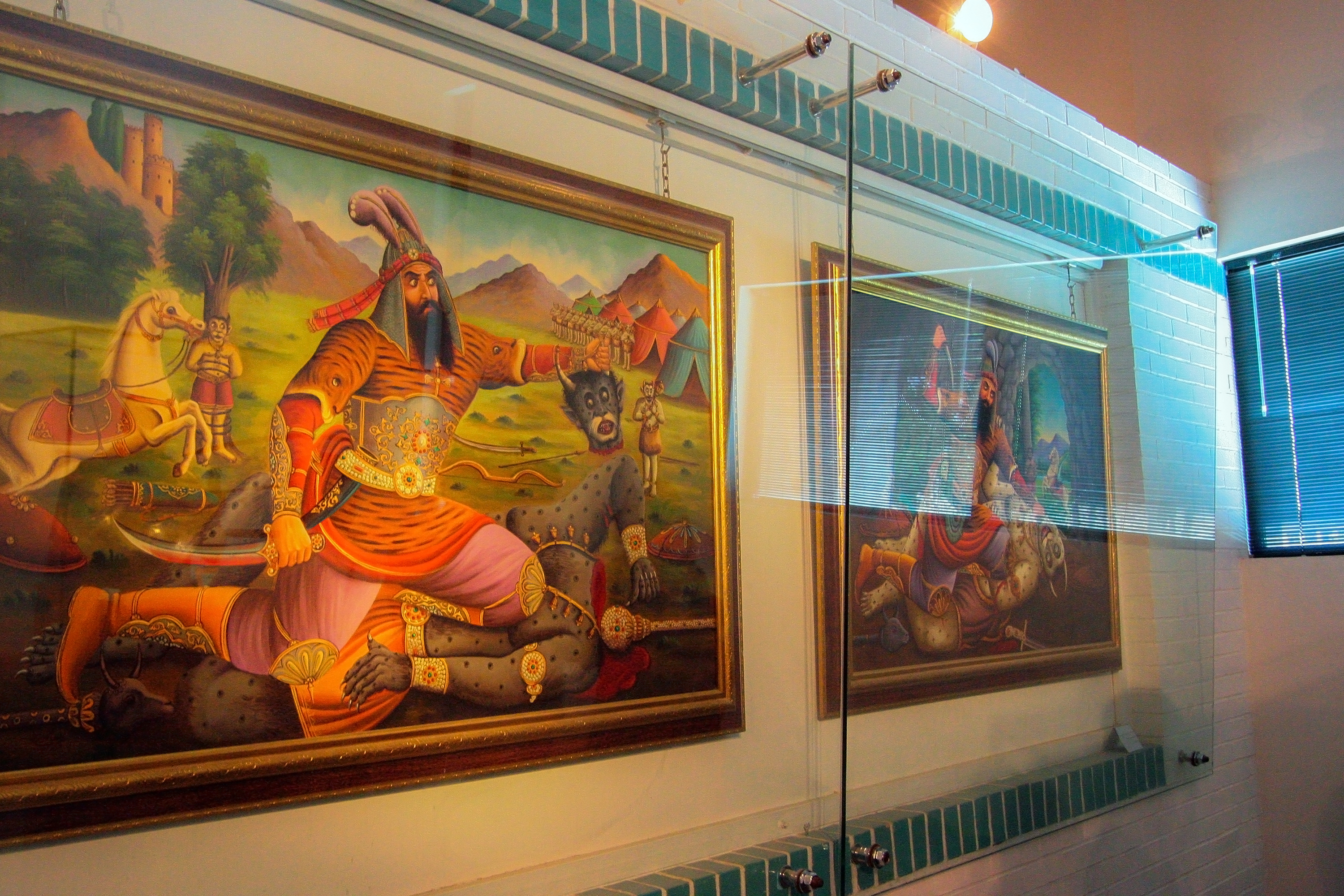
A picture of Rostam in Ferdowsi's tomb

The first mention of Aryan dynasty is found in Ferdowsi masterpiece n the Persian epic, Shahnameh.The name Amol has come up 16 times directly in Shahnameh. In Shahnameh, Mazandaran is mentioned in two different sections. The first mention is implicit, when Fereydun sets its capital in city called Amol:

بیاراست گیتی بسان بهشت
به جای گیا سرو گلبن بکشت
از آمل گذر سوی تمیشه کرد
نشست اندر آن نامور بیشه کرد
بپردازم آمل نیایم به جنگ
سرم را ز نام اندرآرم به ننگ
بزرگان ایران ز گفتار اوی
بروی زمین برنهادند روی
چو اغریرث آمد ز آمل به ری
وزان کارها آگهی یافت کی
بدو گفت کاین چیست کانگیختی
که با شهد حنظل برآمیختی
منوچهر با سلم و تور سترگ
بیاورد ز آمل سپاهی بزرگ
به چین رفت و کین نیا بازخواست
مرا همچنان داستانست راست

―Ferdowsi

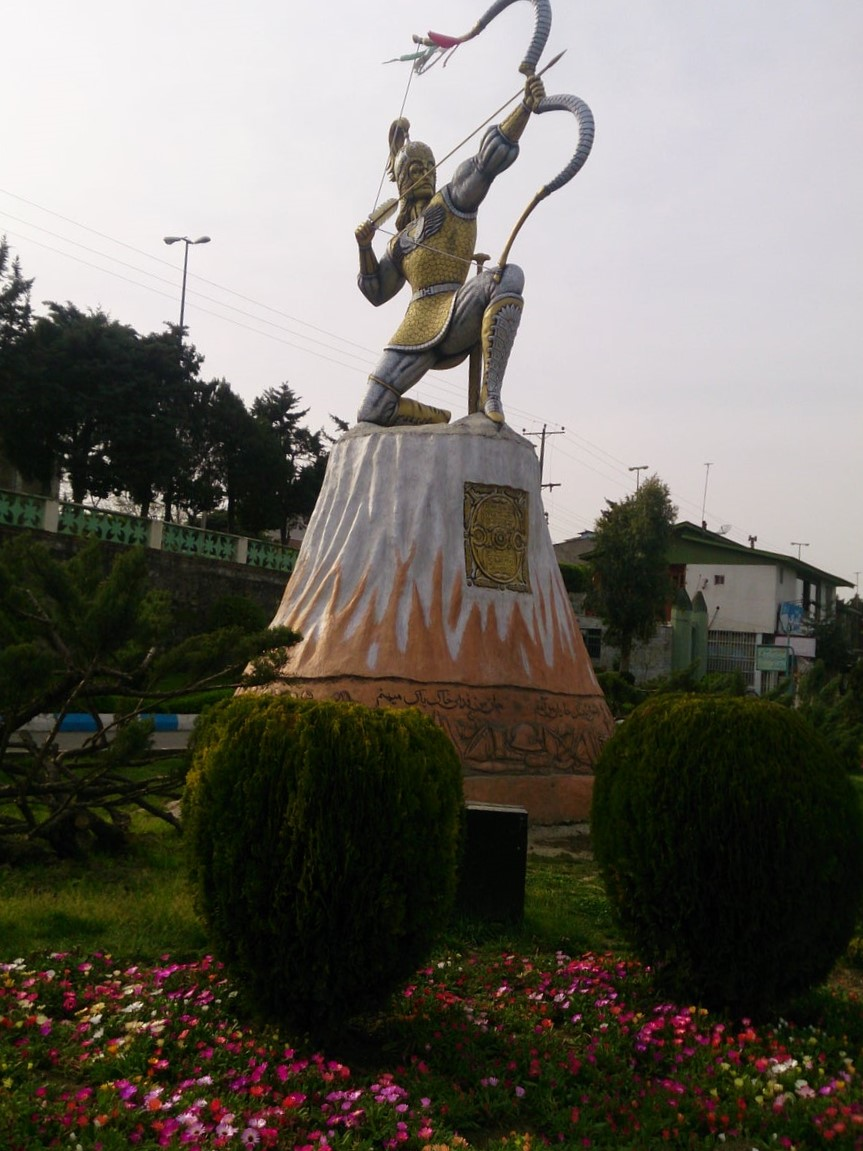
The statue of Arash the Archer in Amol

Iranian hero Arash in Amol threw an arrow to determine the Iranian border; Arash threw from the castle with Amol sequel and its agents to reach the border to have called Turan. The arrow flew the entire morning and fell at noon on the far bank of the Oxus River in what is now Central Asia.

از آن خوانند آرش را کمانگیر
که از آمل بمرو انداخت یک تیر

―Fakhruddin As'ad Gurgani

== Notable people ==
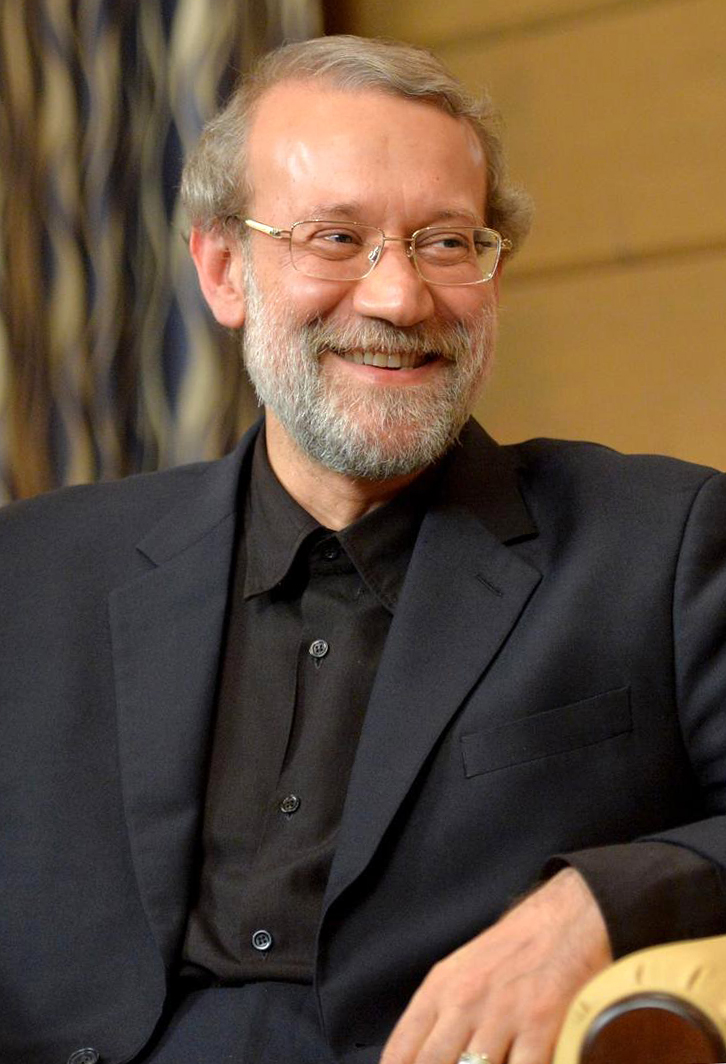
Ali Larijani

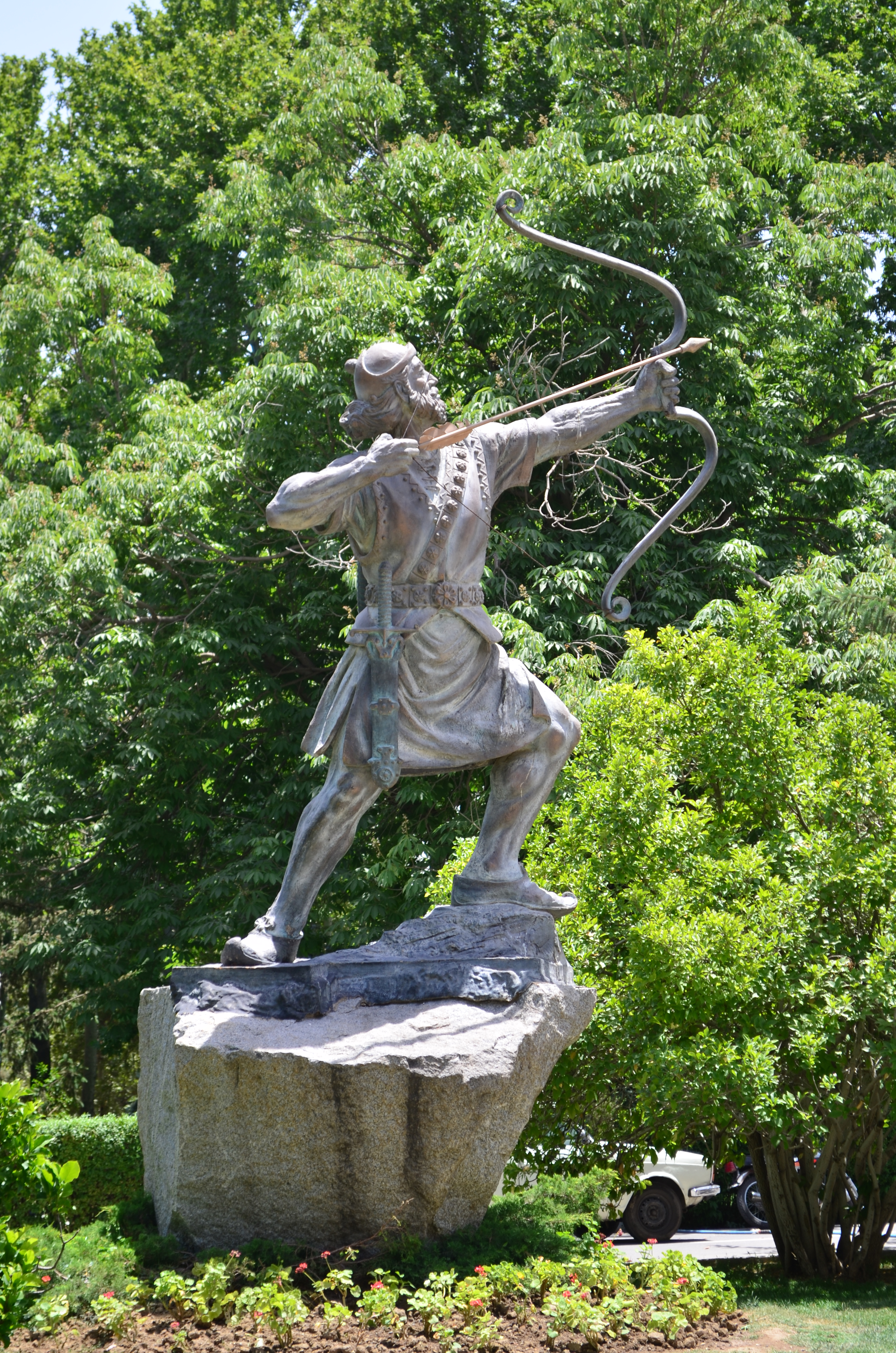
Arash

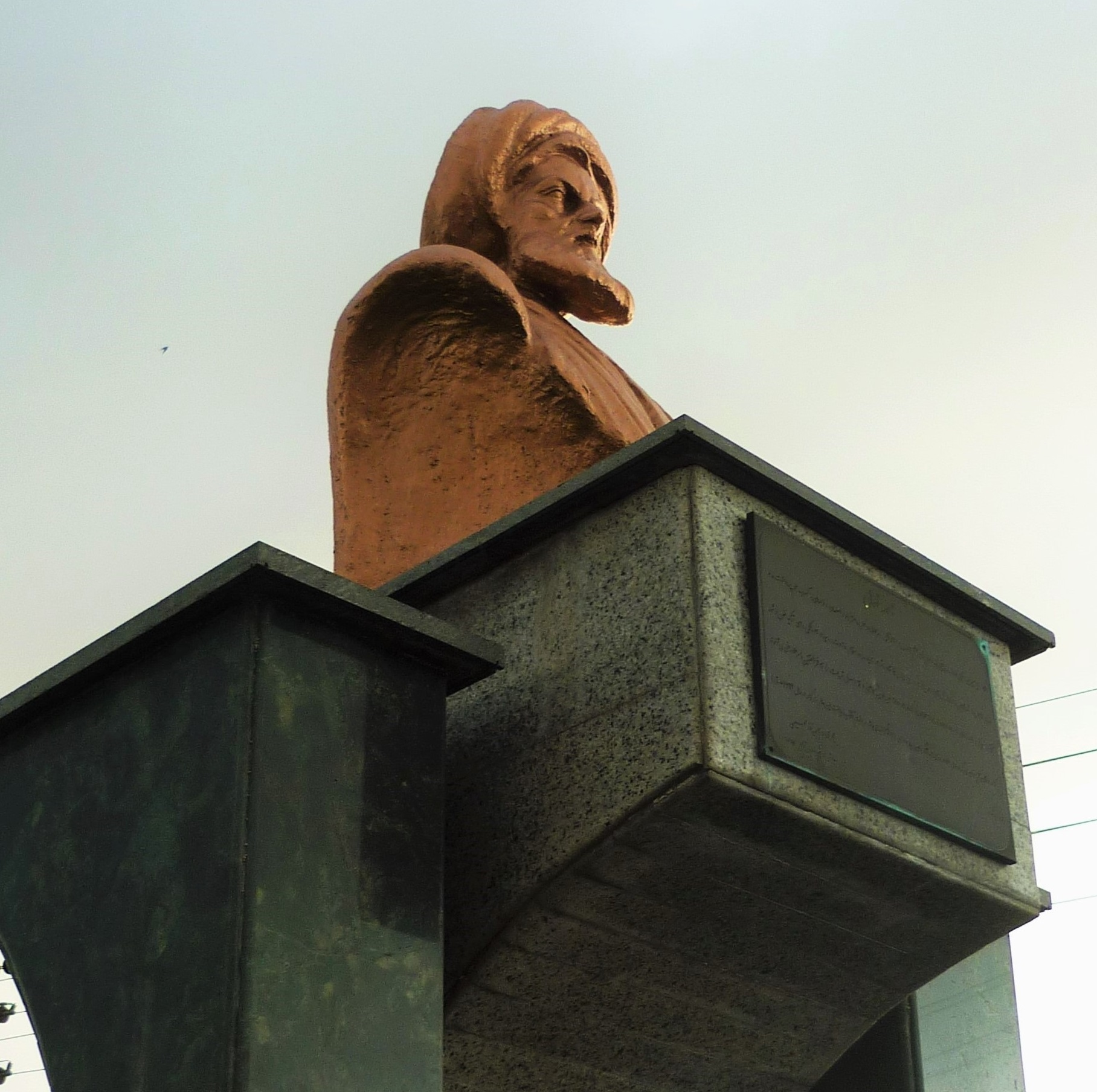
Haydar Amuli

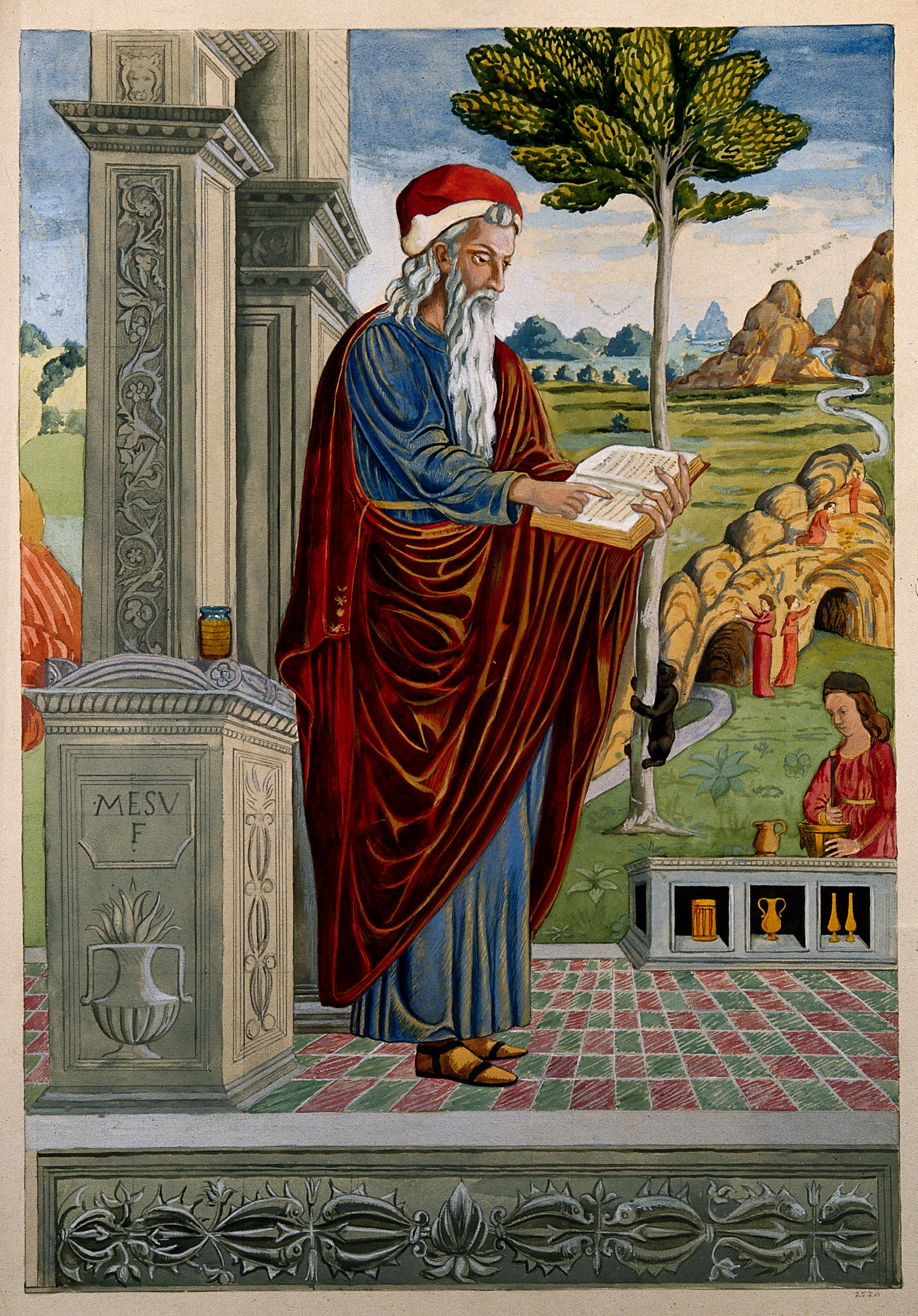
Abu Sahl Al-Quhi

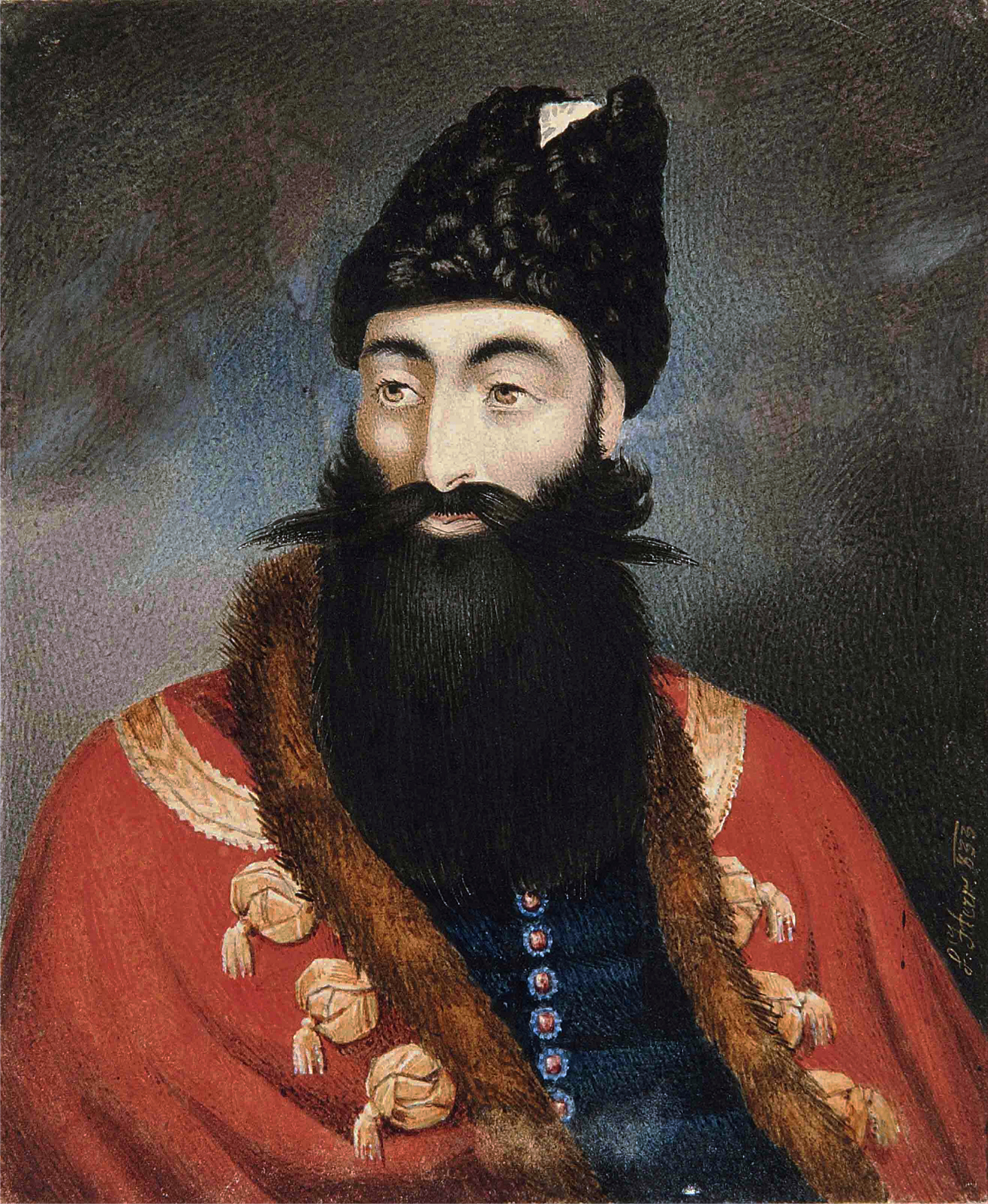
Abbas Mirza

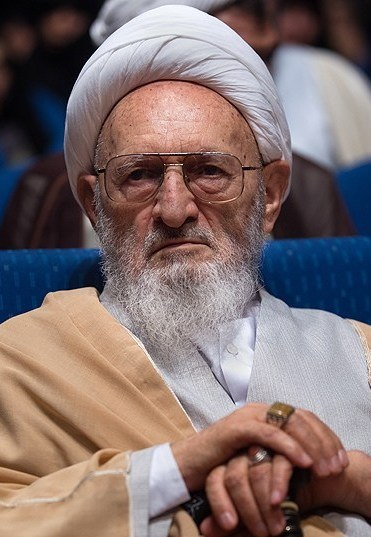
Hassan Hassanzadeh Amoli

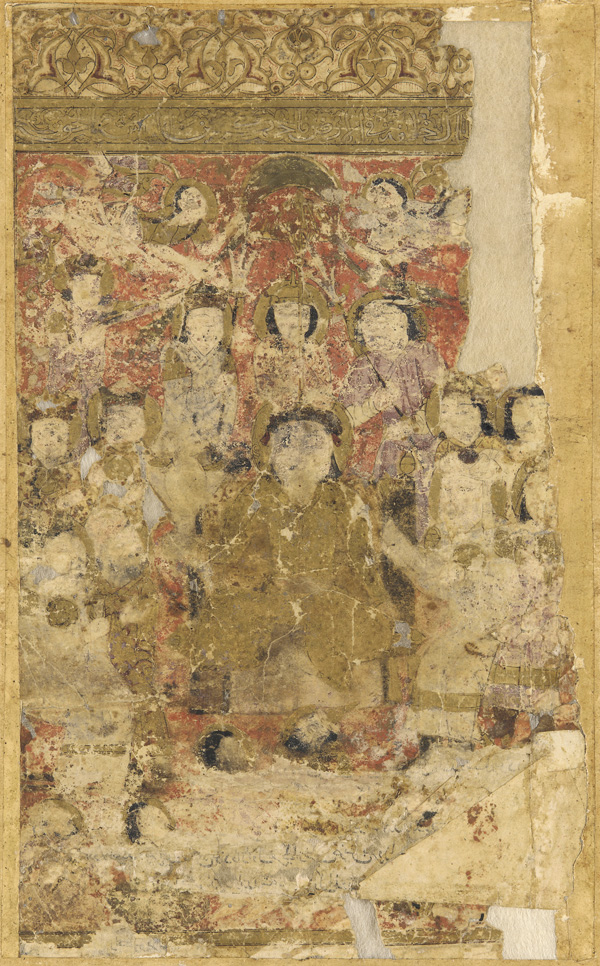
Muḥammad ibn Jarir al-Ṭabari

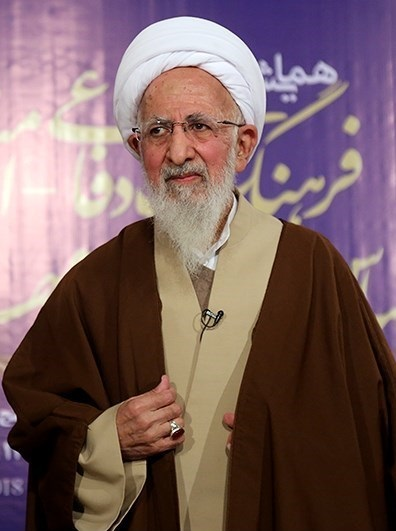
Abdollah Javadi Amoli

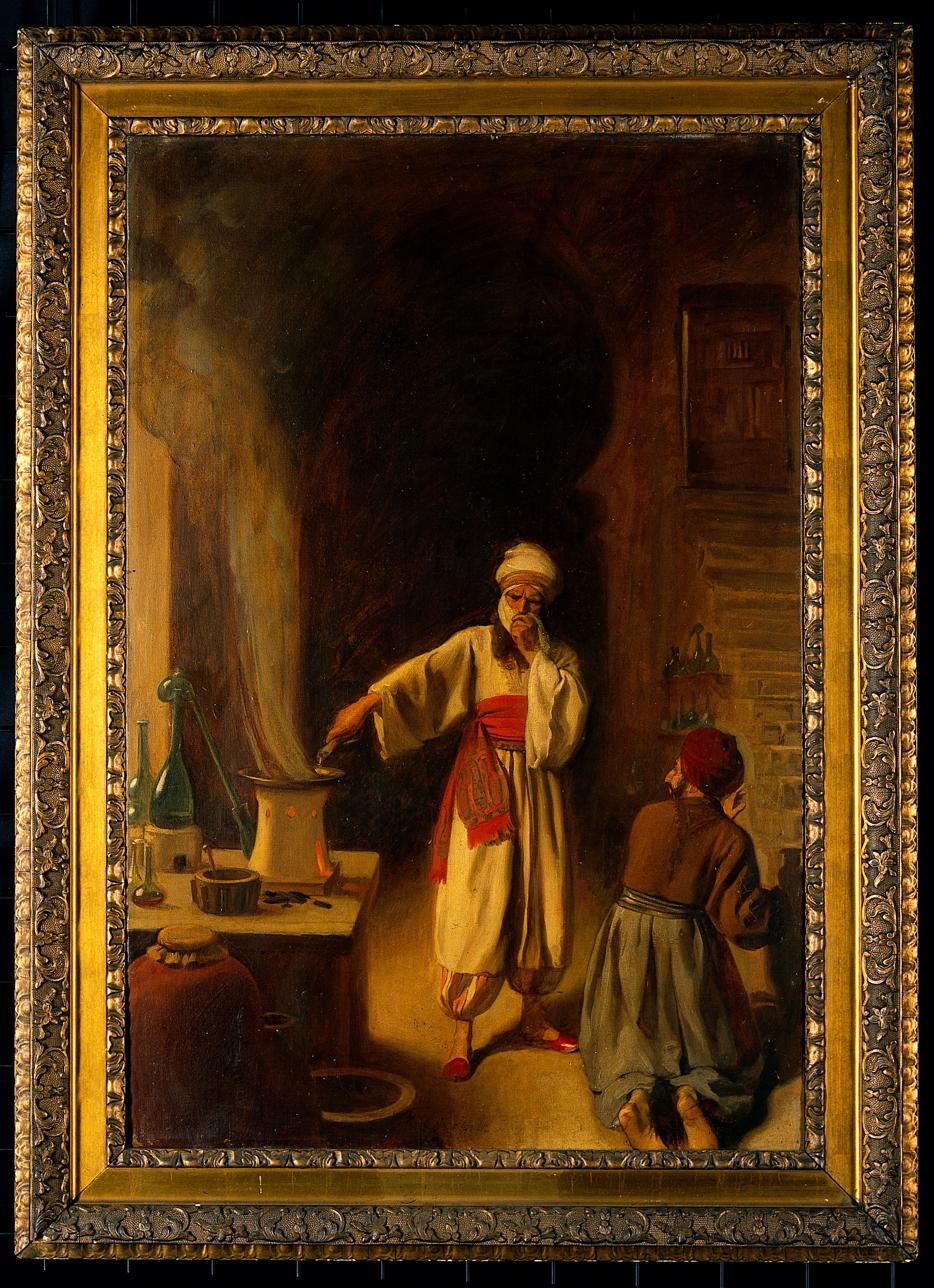
Fakhr al-Din al-Razi

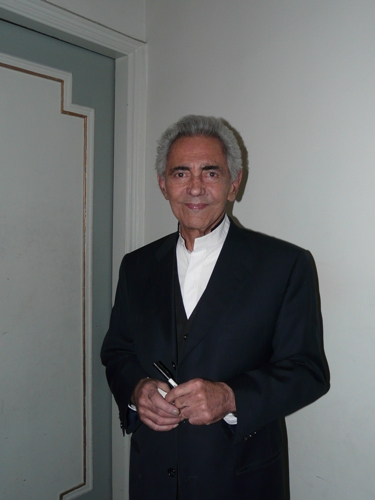
Farhang Sharif

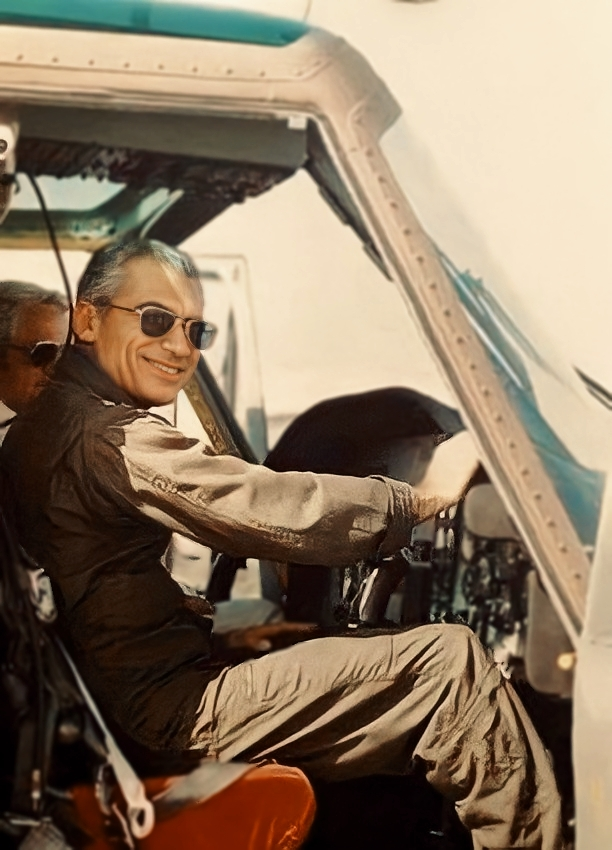
Manouchehr Khosrodad

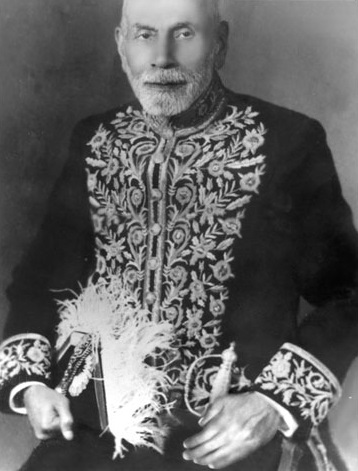
Abdolali Lotfi

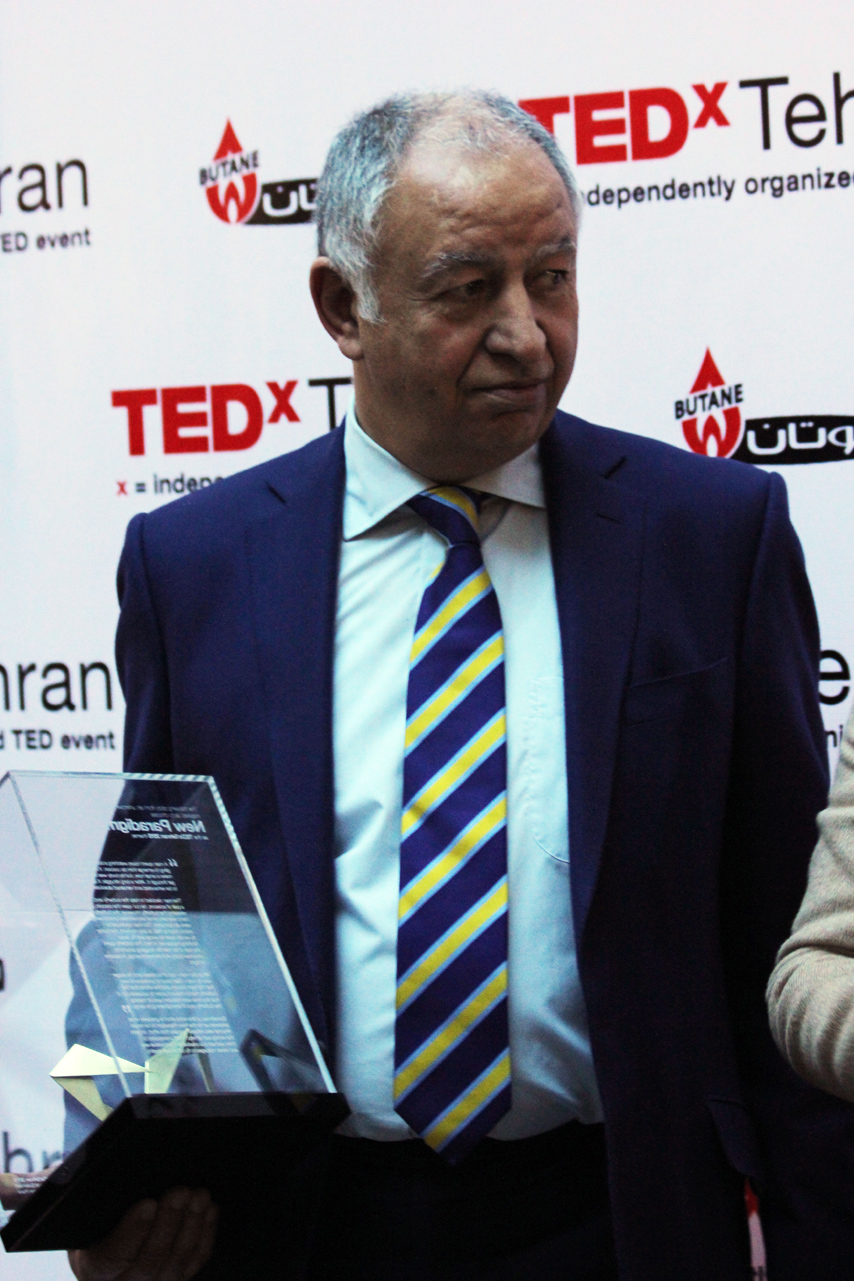
Gholam-Ali Soleimani

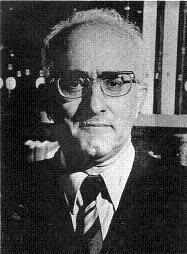
Mohammad Taqi Danesh Pajouh

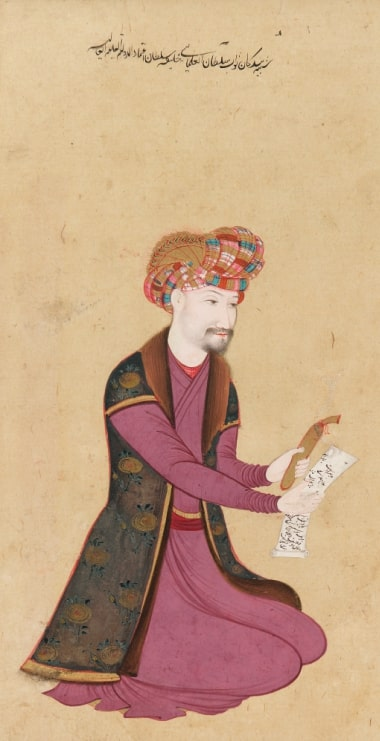
Khalifeh Soltan

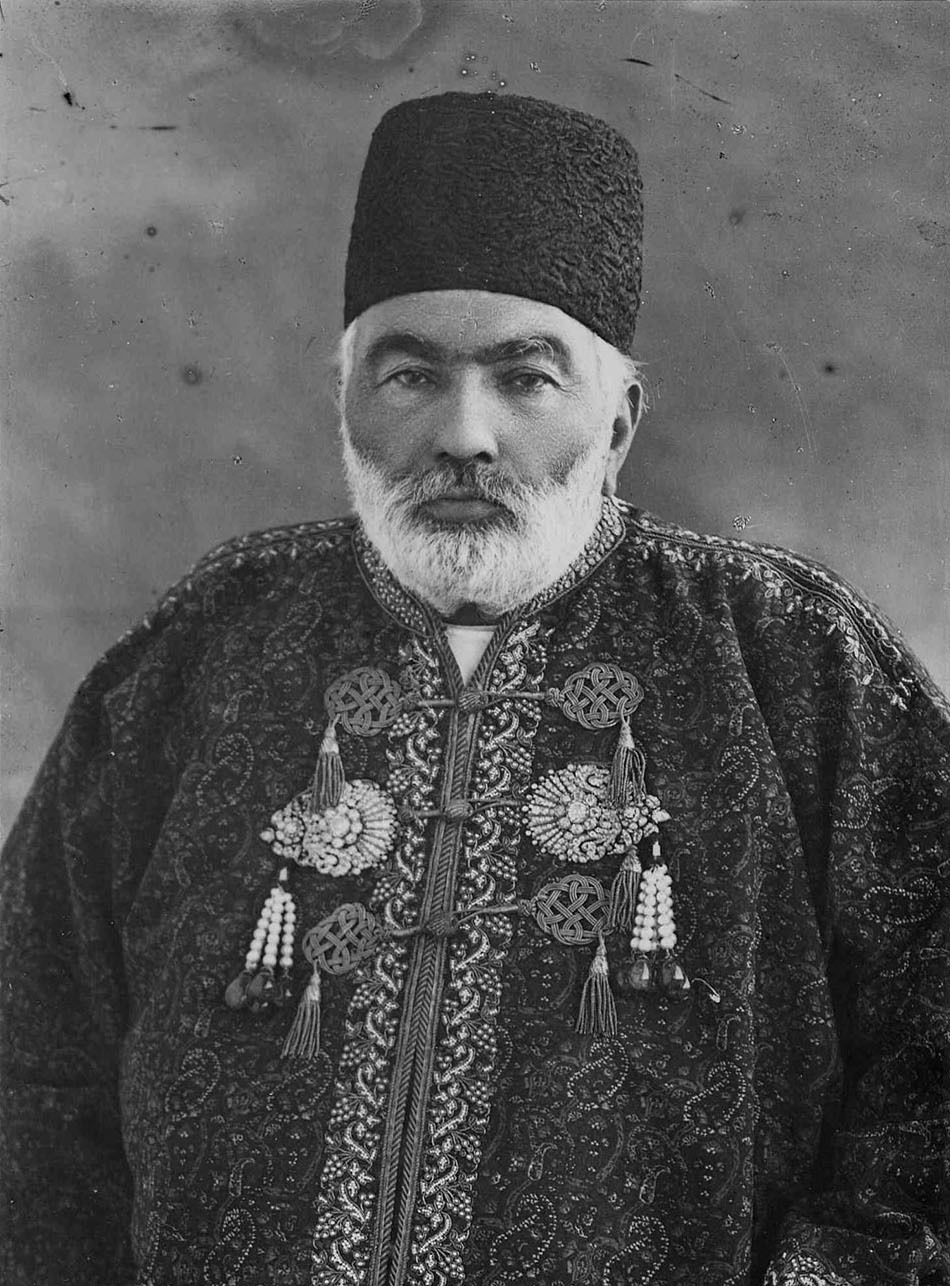
Ahmad Moshir al-Saltaneh

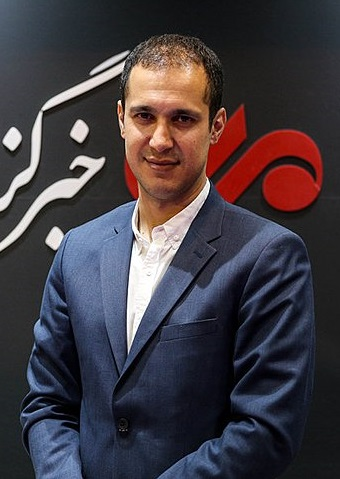
Kaveh Madani

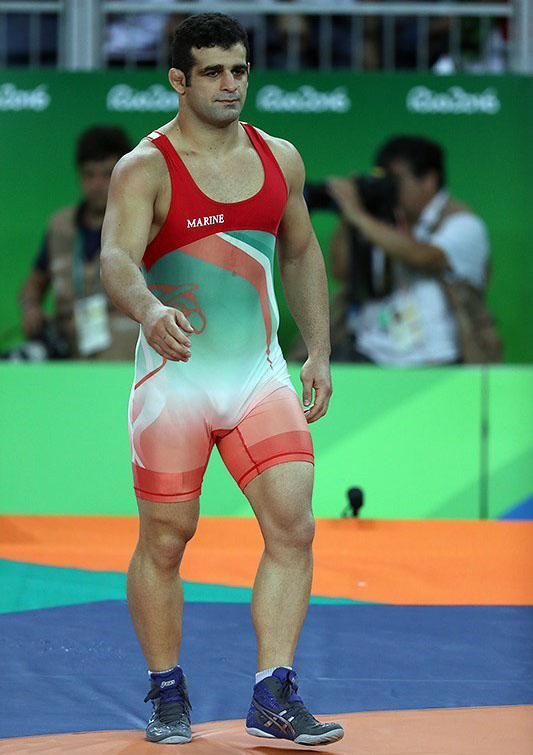
Ghasem Rezaei

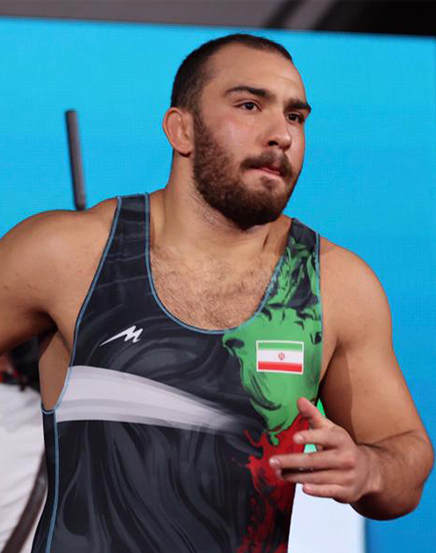
Amir Hossein Zare

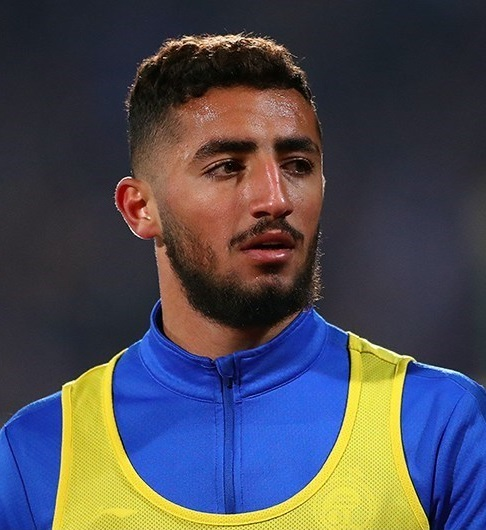
Allahyar Sayyadmanesh

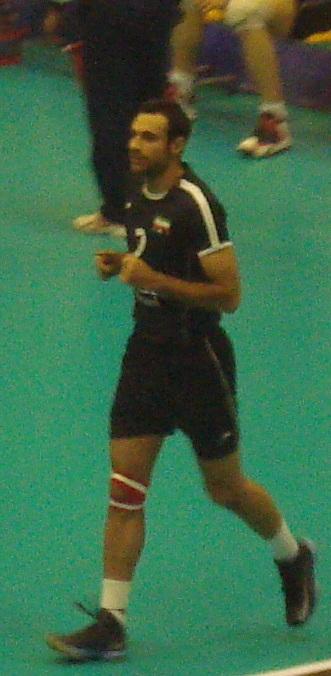
Adel Gholami

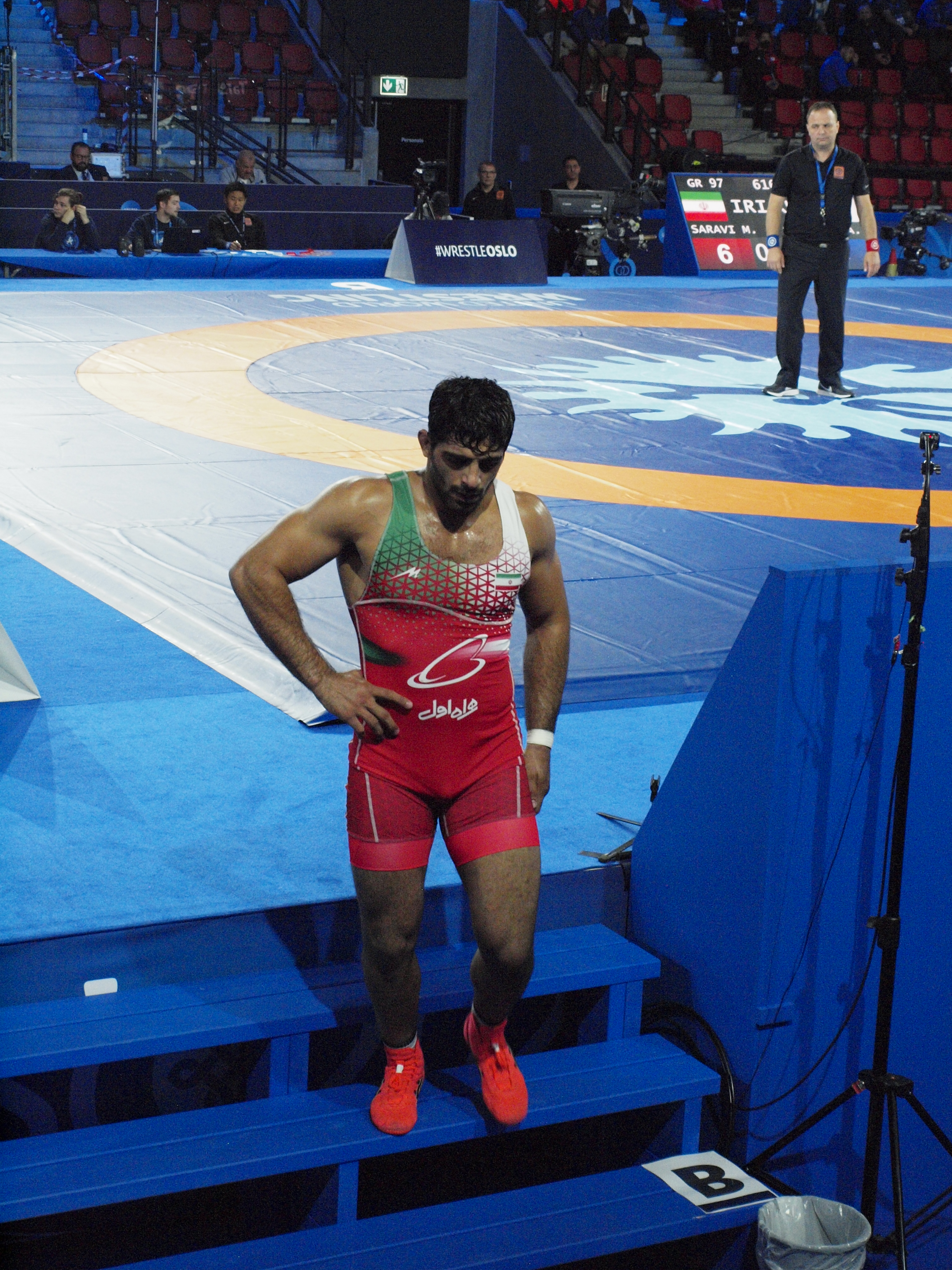
Mohammad Hadi Saravi

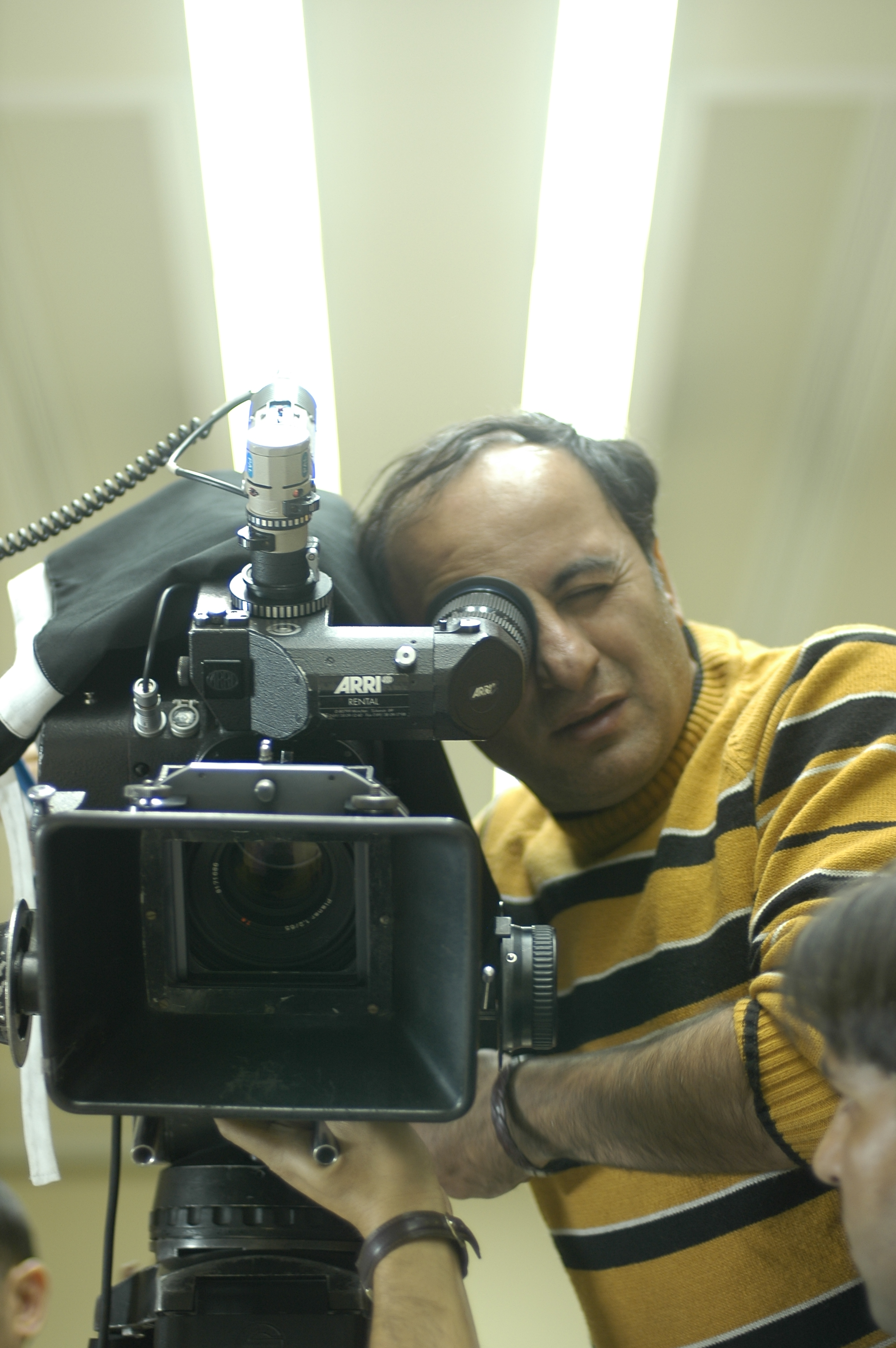
Mohammad Ali Sajjadi

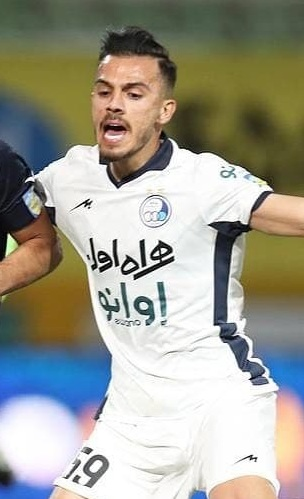
Abolfazl Jalali

- Muhammad ibn Jarir al-Tabari (839–923) – Historian
- Arash the Archer – Legendary hero
- Ali Larijani (b. 1958) – Politician
- Taleb Amoli (b.7th century) – Persian poet
- Ghasem Rezaei (b. 1985) – Wrestler
- Hassan Hassanzadeh Amoli – Philosopher and theologian
- Abdollah Javadi Amoli (b. 1933) – Cleric
- Sahl ibn Bishr (9th century) – Jewish astrologer
- Ali ibn Sahl Rabban Tabari (9th century) – Medieval physician
- Abu Sahl al-Quhi (10th century) – Medieval astronomer and physicist
- Abul Hasan al-Tabari (10th century) – Medieval physician
- Fakhr ad-Din ar-Razi (1149–1209) – Theologian and philosopher
- Ahmad Moshir al-Saltaneh (1260–1337) – Prime minister
- Mohammad Taqi Daneshpajouh (1911–1996) – Scholar
- Farhang Sharif (b. 1931) – Musician
- Abdolali Lotfi – Politician and judges
- Ibn Isfandiyar (13th century) – Historian and Author
- Seyyid Hayder Amuli (1319–1385) – Shi'ite mystic and Sufi leader
- Muhammad ibn Mahmud Amuli (14th century) – Medieval physician
- Abbas Mirza (1789–1833) – Qajar crown prince of Persia
- Farrukhan Tabari (8th century) – Medieval astrologer
- Manouchehr Khosrodad – Major general
- Qavam al-Din al-Marashi – Founder of the Marashi dynasty
- Kaveh Madani – Scientist and activist
- Hossein Ali Mirza – Prince of Qajar
- Muhammad Taqi Amoli (1887–1971) – Cleric
- Mirza Hashem Amoli (1899–1993) – Cleric
- Yahya ibn Abi Mansur (832) – Astronomy
- Haseb-i Tabari (1092–1108) – Astronomy
- Mirza Reza Qoli Nava'i – Politician
- Zahir al-Din Marashi (1413–1488) – Historian
- Abul-Abbas Qassab Amoli – Mystic
- Massoud Monfared Niyaki – Major general
- Ghassem Hashemi Nezhad – Literary critic and writer
- Iraj Malekpour – Physics
- Gholam-Ali Soleimani – Manager
- Mulla Ali Kani (1267–1306) – Learned
- Mohammad-Ali Mirza Dowlatshah (1789–1821) – Qajar dynasty prince
- Iraj Malekpour (b.1941) – Physicist
- Siraj Qumri Amoli (b. 1368) – Persian poet
- Ghassem Hashemi Nezhad – Writer
- Abdol-Qader Gilani (1078–1166) – Sufi leader
- Mohammad-Javad Larijani (b. 1951) – Politician
- Al-Natili Tabari (10th century) – Medieval physician
- Majid Ahi (b.1886) – Politician
- Mehri Ahi (b.1922) – Translator
- Behrouz Ataei – Volleyball coach
- Mirza Reza Qoli Nava'i – Politician
- Sadeq Larijani (b. 1960) – Cleric and politician
- Bagher Larijani (b. 1961) – Physician
- Fazel Larijani (b. 1953) – Master
- Adel Gholami (b. 1986) – Volleyball player
- Ahmad Shariatzadeh – Lawyer
- Tayyeb Tabari – Judge
- Amir Hossein Zare – Wrestling
- Allahyar Sayyadmanesh – Football player
- Mohammad Hadi Saravi – Wrestling
- Khalifeh Soltan – Statesman and cleric
- Sati-un-Nissa – Physician
- Abbas Amiri Moghaddam – Actor
- Mohammad Ali Sadjadi (b. 1957) – Director
- Iskandar-i Shaykhi – Afrasiyab dynasty Ruler
- Abdullah Khan Ahmadieh – Doctor
- Al-Nagawri – Persian physician
- Ibrahim Khawas – Sufi
- Ali Kaveh – Photojournalism
- Amir Hossein Esfandiar (b.1999) – Volleyball player
- Amirali Nabavian – Television presenter
- Al-Lalaka'i – Author
- Ali Arsalan – Wrestler
- Nader Moghaddas – Director
- Fatemeh Javadi (b. 1959) – Politician
- Behrang Alavi – Actor
- Sharif al-Ulama – Authority
- Abolfazl Jalali – Football player
- Ali Noorzad – Politician
- Masoud Forootan – Actor
- Hamed Shiri – Football player
- Hossein Ali Mirza – Prince Governor
- Mohsen Hajipour – Wrestler
- Sedigheh Daryaei – Athlete

== Distance ==
The distance of major Iranian cities from Amol:

City	Km distance
Sari	72
Tehran	183
Ramsar	185
Rasht	293
Kashan	424
Astara	473
Hamedan	500
Mashhad	802
Yazd	808
Tabriz	825
Ahvaz	960
Kerman	1158
Bandar Abbas	1452

== Sister cities ==
- Lahore, Pakistan
- Cần Thơ, Vietnam
