= Akka =

Akka or AKKA may refer to:

== Arts and entertainment ==
- Akka (film), a 1976 Indian Tamil film
- Akka (TV series), a 2014–2015 Indian Tamil soap opera
- Akka, a character in the children's novel The Wonderful Adventures of Nils by Selma Lagerlöf
- AKKA, a fictional weapon in the Legion of Space Series by Jack Williamson

== People ==
- Akka Mahadevi (12th century), Indian Kannada poet
- Lahcen Samsam Akka (born 1942), Moroccan shot putter
- Narmada Akka (died 2012), member of the Communist Party of India
- Akka (c. 2700 BC), one spelling of the name of the Mesopotamian king of Kish

== Places ==
- Acre, Israel (Arabic: Akka), a city
- Akka, Morocco, a town
- Akka, Republic of Dagestan, Russia, a rural locality
- Áhkká, a mountain in Sweden

== Ships ==
- MV Akka, a Swedish cargo ship
- SS Akka, a German (later Kriegsmarine) cargo ship

== Religion ==
- Áhkká goddesses in Sámi shamanism:
  - Jábmiidáhkká
  - Juoksáhkká
  - Máttaráhkká
  - Sáráhkká
  - Uksáhkká
- Maaemä, also known as Akka, a goddess in Finnish and Estonian mythologies

== Other uses ==
- 8034 Akka, a near-Earth asteroid
- AKKA, Association of Kannada Kootas of America, a nonprofit organization
- Akka (toolkit), a software development kit for Java

== See also ==
- Acre (disambiguation)
- Aka (disambiguation)
- Akha (disambiguation)
- Akkas (name)
- Akkaş, a Turkish surname
- Akko (disambiguation)
- Melkite Greek Catholic Archeparchy of Akka
- Saint Jean d'Acre (disambiguation)
- Siege of Acre (disambiguation)
