= Lake Sahun =

Lake in Iran

Coordinates: 35.84°N 52.34°E

- Location within Iran
- Basin countries: Iran
- Surface area: 1,000 acres (400 ha) in last time
- Settlements: Amol, Iran

Lake Sahun is a lake on the southwestern slopes of Damavand Peak, Iran, near the village of Nava in the Larijan section of Amol city. Its altitude is more than 3000 meters above sea level. In the past, the lake covered an area of more than 1,000 hectares and was full of water but over time, due to human intervention, its water level and volume has decreased. It has now become a swamp surrounded by large fields and has become a summer pasture for livestock, wildlife, and birds. This old lake has a special area for temporary residence. The extensive pastures, beautiful views of the mountains, and the peak of Damavand, along with the flow of small and large springs, have created significant attractions and scenes that can be used by enthusiasts and tourists in the summer.

== Geography location ==
The lake is located in the north of Khartab Mountain coming from the south to Majileh Dosh Mountain going behind the peak of Dobrar and Ira village. From the west it can be seen next to the Niak, Kenaranjam, and Kandloo villages and from the east, it is seen from the beautiful pastures of Azo (Azab) and the high peak of Ebrat Mountain. The lake ends in Lasem village after passing a road on the southeast of Aspeh Khak (Khak Sefid) and Sangin-Ooh (Sangeh Noh) properties.
