= Aka =

Aka, aka, or AKA may refer to:

== Languages ==
- Aka language (Sudan)
- Aka language, in the Central African Republic
- Hruso language, in India, also known as Aka
- A prefix in the names of Great Andamanese languages
- Akan language, a Ghanaian language (ISO 639-2 and ISO 639-3 codes)

== People ==
- Aka (name), any of several people
- Aka people, in the Central African Republic and Congo
- Aka (tribe), of Kameng, Arunachal Pradesh, India
- AKA (rapper), stage name of South African Kiernan Forbes (1988–2023)

== Places ==
=== Japan ===
- Aka, Fukuoka, a village
- Mount Aka (Daisetsuzan), Hokkaidō
- Mount Aka (Yatsugatake), Honshū
- Aka Island, Okinawa Prefecture
- Aka River, Yamagata Prefecture

=== Elsewhere ===
- Aka, Hungary, a village
- Aka Hills, Arunachal Pradesh, India
- Aka, Iran, a village in Khuzestan Province

== Arts and entertainment ==
=== Film and television ===
- AKA (2023 film), a French-language action crime thriller
- AKA (2002 film), a British LGBTQ-related drama
- "A.K.A." (Jericho episode), 2007
- a.k.a. Cartoon, a Canadian animation company
- Aka Pella (Histeria!), an animated TV character
- Channel AKA, former name of the UK music television channel Now 70s
- AKA (TV series), a Bangladeshi web series

=== Music ===
- The A.K.A.s, an American rock band
- A.K.A. (album), 2014, by Jennifer Lopez
- "AKA", a video by True Widow

== Sports ==
- Aka (Burmese), martial arts movements
- Aka (sailing), part of a multi-hull boat
- Aka Arena, a football stadium in Hønefoss, Norway
- American Kickboxing Academy
- American Kitefliers Association
- Australian Karting Association
- Aka, certain types of red belt (martial arts)

== Science and technology ==
- Alcoholic ketoacidosis, a medical condition
- Authentication and Key Agreement, a security protocol used in 3G networks

== Transportation ==
- Ankang Fuqiang Airport (IATA code: AKA), China
- Atka Airport (FAA location identifier: AKA), Alaska
- Aka Station, a railway station in Aka, Fukuoka Prefecture, Japan
- AKA (car), a defunct Czech automobile manufacturer
- AKA, a retired US Navy hull classification symbol for attack cargo ship

== Other uses ==
- Manpower Directorate (Agaf Koakh Adam) of the Israeli Defence Forces
- Alpha Kappa Alpha, an African-American sorority
- Aga Khan Academies, an educational initiative
- Also known as, an alias or pseudonym

== See also ==
- Akas (disambiguation)
- Akka (disambiguation)
- Akha (disambiguation)
