= ACAS =

ACAS or Acas may refer to:

== Aviation ==
- Airborne collision avoidance system, an International Civil Aviation Organization standard
- Assistant Chief of the Air Staff, a senior appointment in the Royal Air Force

== Other uses ==
- Aboriginal Children's Advancement Society, an organization in New South Wales
- Acas (Advisory, Conciliation and Arbitration Service), an independent non-departmental public body of the Government of the UK
- Acâș, a commune in Satu Mare County, Romania
- Acas District, Ocros, Peru
- Associate in the Casualty Actuarial Society, a level of membership in the Casualty Actuarial Society
- Assured Compliance Assessment Solution, a tool that automatically identifies configuration vulnerabilities on US Department of Defense computer systems

== See also ==
- Akas (disambiguation)
