= Ikaw =

Ikaw may refer to:

- "Ikaw" (song), a 2014 song by Yeng Constantino
- "Ikaw", by Sarah Geronimo from Taking Flight, 2007
- "Ikaw", by Sharon Cuneta from Si Sharon at si Canseco, 1992

== See also ==
- Akha (disambiguation)
