= Akha =

Akha may refer to:

- Akha, Iran, a village in Mazandaran Province, Iran
- Akha, alternate name of Dinan, Mazandaran, a village in Mazandaran Province, Iran
- Akha people, of Myanmar, China and Southeast Asia
- Akha language, the Loloish (Sino-Tibetan) language of the Akha people
- Akha Bhagat (1615–1674), or Akha Rahiyadas Soni, a mediaeval Gujarati poet of India
- Akha Expedition, an 1883 military expedition in India

== See also ==
- Akka (disambiguation)
- Aka (disambiguation)
