= Aka (name) =

Aka is a given name and surname. Notable people with the name include:

== Given name ==
- Aka Akasaka (born 1988), Japanese manga artist
- Aka Gündüz (1886–1958), Turkish poet, composer and politician
- Aka Høegh (born 1947), Greenlandic painter, graphic artist and sculptor
- Aka Nanitashvili, Georgian fashion designer
- Aka Morchiladze, Georgian writer

== Surname ==
- Brice Aka (born 1983), Ivorian footballer
- Essis Aka (born 1990), Ivorian footballer
- Jonathan Aka (born 1986), French basketball player
- Margaret Aka (born 1976), soccer player and coach from Papua New Guinea
- Pascal Aka (born 1985), Ivorian film director, actor, music video director and producer
- Véronique Aka (born 1959), Ivorian politician
- Wilfrid Aka (born 1979), French-born Ivorian professional basketball player
