= Gazaneh, Mazandaran =

Village in Mazandaran province, Iran

Gazaneh Persian: گزانه
- Village
- Location within Iran
- Coordinates: 35°55′01″N 52°12′40″E
- Country: Iran
- Province: Mazandaran
- County: Amol
- District: Larijan
- Rural District: Bala Larijan

Population (2016)
  - Total: 246
- Time zone: UTC+3:30 (IRST)

Gazaneh (Persian: گزانه) (Note: Also romanized as Gazāneh; also known as Kazūna) is a village in Bala Larijan Rural District of Larijan District in Amol County, Mazandaran province, Iran.

== Demographics ==
=== Population ===
At the time of the 2006 National Census, the village's population was 119 in 43 households. The following census in 2011 counted 152 people in 42 households. The 2016 census measured the population of the village as 246 people in 85 households.
