= Afsaneh Sara =

Afsaneh Sara افسانه سرا
- Village
- Country: Iran
- Province: Mazandaran
- County: Amol
- Bakhsh: Larijan
- Rural District: Bala Larijan

Population (2006)
  - Total: 189
- Time zone: UTC+3:30 (IRST)

Afsaneh Sara (Persian: افسانه سرا, also Romanized as Āfsāneh Sarā) is a village in Bala Larijan Rural District, Larijan District, Amol County, Mazandaran Province, Iran. At the 2006 census, its population was 189, in 4 families. At the 2016 census the measured population was 0.
