= Akas =

Akas may refer to:

- Akas (bus company), an inter-city bus company in Indonesia
- Hruso people, an ethnic group of India
- Aka people, an ethnic group of Central Africa
- Chima Akas, Nigerian footballer

== See also ==
- Acas (disambiguation)
- Ackas, a town in Finland
- Akash (disambiguation)
- Aka (disambiguation)
