= Tara, Iran =

Tara ترا
- Village
- Location within Iran
- Coordinates: 35°55′27″N 52°17′53″E
- Country: Iran
- Province: Mazandaran
- County: Amol
- Bakhsh: Larijan
- Rural District: Bala Larijan

Population (2016)
  - Total: 93
- Time zone: UTC+3:30 (IRST)

Tara (Persian: ترا, also Romanized as Tarā; also known as Tarādīnān) is a village in Bala Larijan Rural District, Larijan District, Amol County, Mazandaran Province, Iran. At the 2016 census, its population was 93, in 36 families. Increased from 31 people in 2006.
