= Ab-e Garm, Mazandaran =

Village in Mazandaran province, Iran

Ab-e Garm Persian: اب گرم
- Village
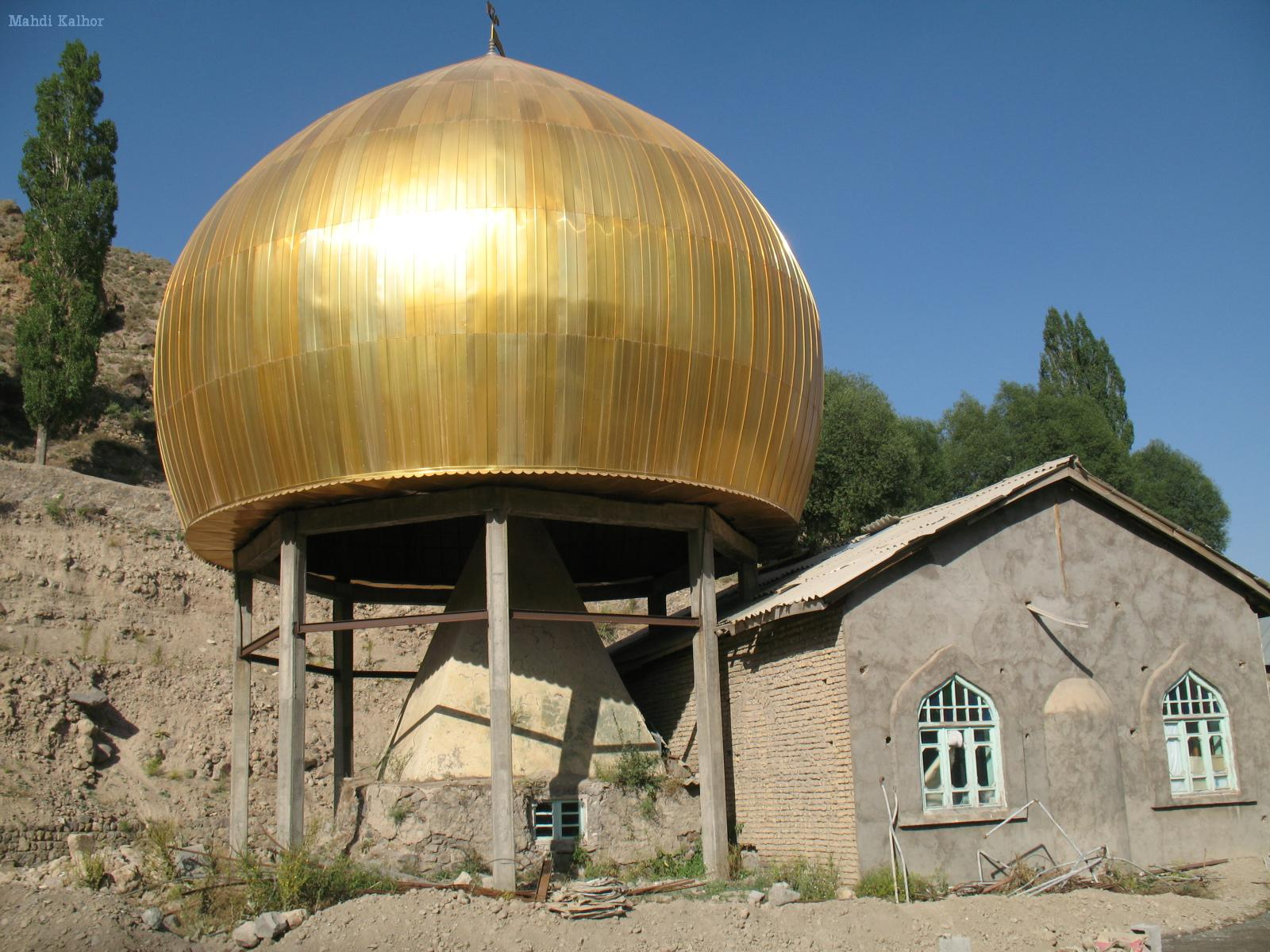
- Tomb in the village of Ab-e Garm

- Location within Iran
- Coordinates: 35°54′23″N 52°11′36″E
- Country: Iran
- Province: Mazandaran
- County: Amol
- District: Larijan
- Rural District: Bala Larijan

Population (2016)
  - Total: 262
- Time zone: UTC+3:30 (IRST)

Ab-e Garm (Persian: اب گرم) (Note: Also romanized as Āb-e Garm; also known as Āb Garm-e-Lārījān, Āb Garm-e Lārījān-e Pā’īn, Āb Garm-e Pā’īn Lārījān, and Ābgarm Lārījān) is a village in Bala Larijan Rural District of Larijan District in Amol County, Mazandaran province, Iran.

== Demographics ==
=== Population ===
At the time of the 2006 National Census, the village's population was 306 in 91 households. The following census in 2011 counted 357 people in 107 households. The 2016 census measured the population of the village as 262 people in 104 households.
