= Hareh =

Village in Mazandaran province, Iran

Hareh Persian: هاره
- Village
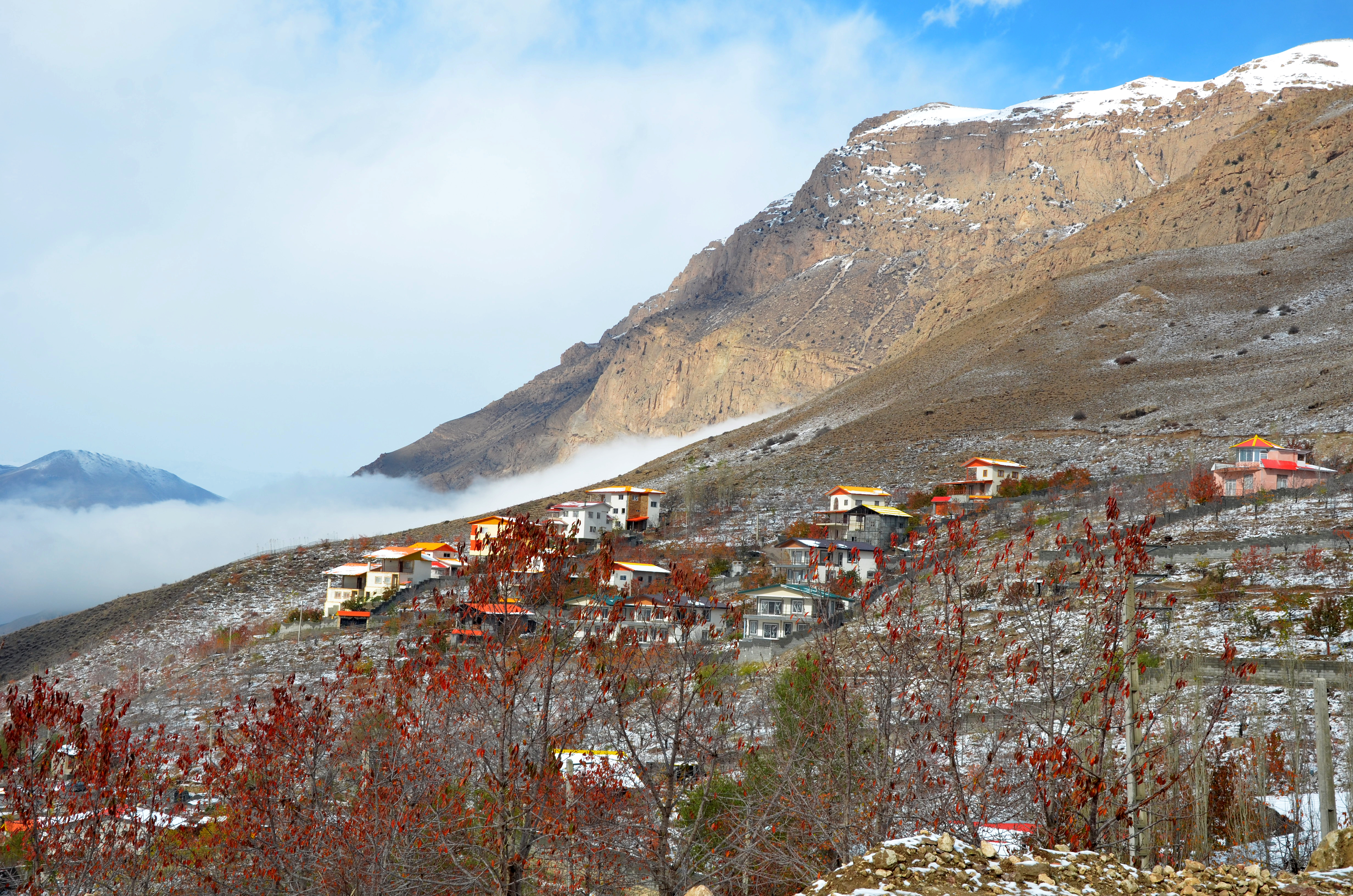
- The village of Hareh

- Location within Iran
- Coordinates: 35°54′36″N 52°18′27″E
- Country: Iran
- Province: Mazandaran
- County: Amol
- District: Larijan
- Rural District: Bala Larijan

Population (2016)
  - Total: 103
- Time zone: UTC+3:30 (IRST)

Hareh (Persian: هاره) (Note: Also romanized as Hāreh) is a village in Bala Larijan Rural District of Larijan District in Amol County, Mazandaran province, Iran.

== Demographics ==
=== Population ===
At the time of the 2006 National Census, the village's population was 163 in 51 households. The following census in 2011 counted 69 people in 28 households. The 2016 census measured the population of the village as 103 people in 35 households.
