= Shangoldeh =

Village in Mazandaran province, Iran

Shangoldeh Persian: شنگلده
- Village
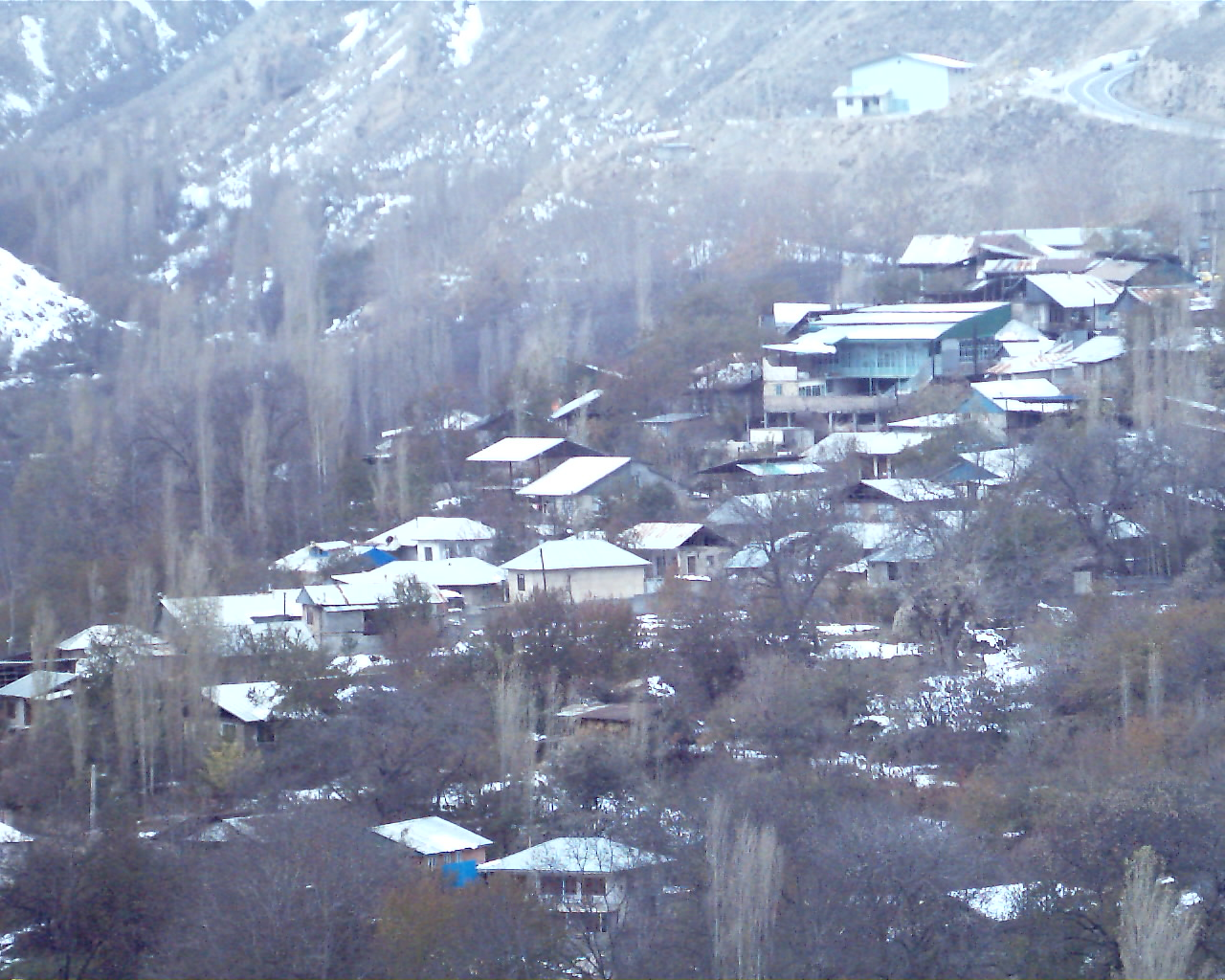
- The village of Shangdoleh in winter

- Location within Iran
- Country: Iran
- Province: Mazandaran
- County: Amol
- District: Larijan
- Rural District: Bala Larijan

Population (2016)
  - Total: 137
- Time zone: UTC+3:30 (IRST)

Shangoldeh (Persian: شنگلده) (Note: Also known as Shangoleh and Shanguldeh) is a village in Bala Larijan Rural District of Larijan District in Amol County, Mazandaran province, Iran.

== Demographics ==
=== Population ===
At the time of the 2006 National Census, the village's population was 214 in 61 households. The following census in 2011 counted 139 people in 45 households. The 2016 census measured the population of the village as 137 people in 49 households.
