= Anheh =

Anheh انهه
- Village
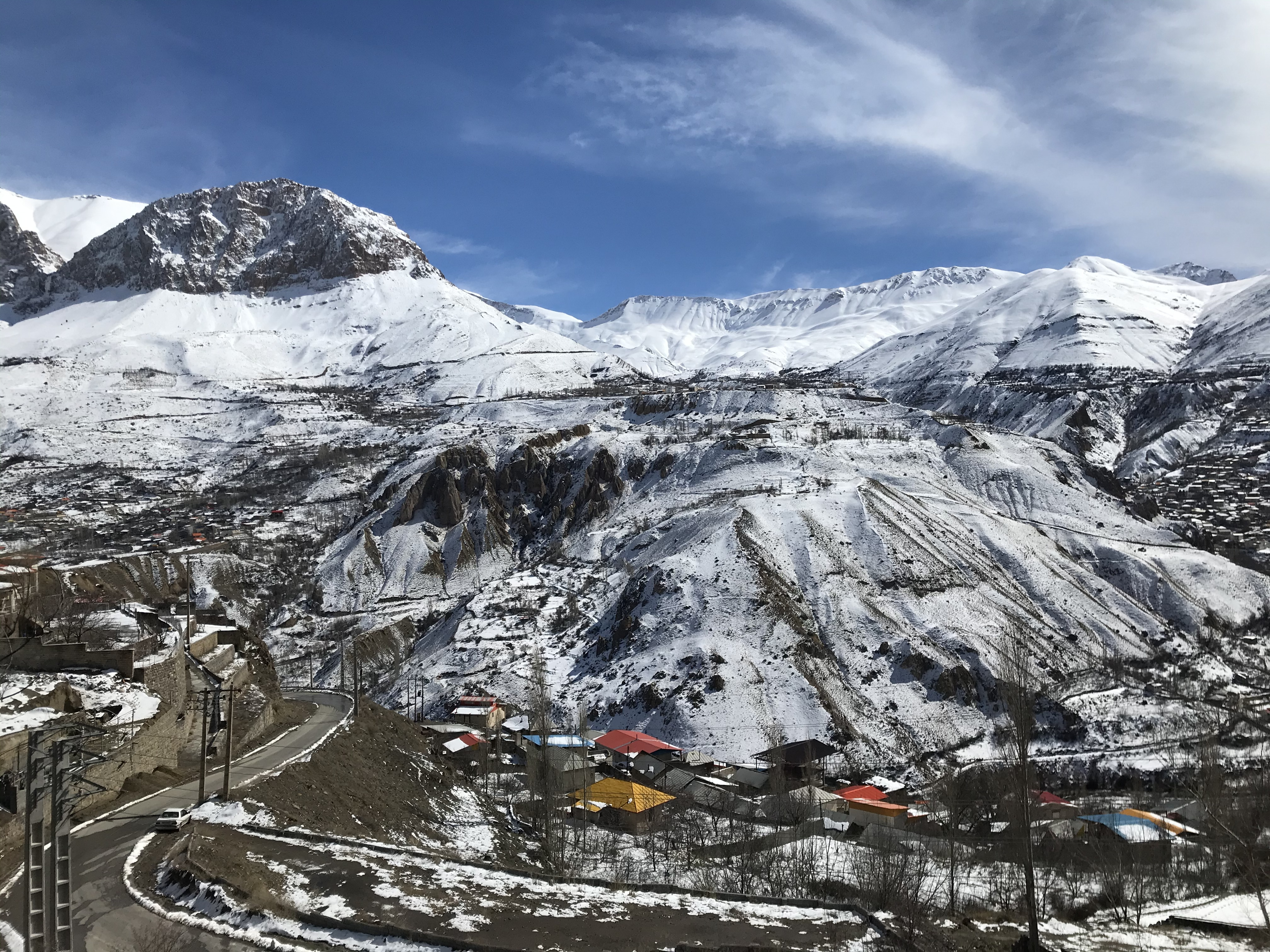
- Winter in Anheh

- Location within Iran
- Coordinates: 35°53′15″N 52°11′18″E
- Country: Iran
- Province: Mazandaran
- County: Amol
- Bakhsh: Larijan
- Rural District: Bala Larijan

Population (2016)
  - Total: 88
- Time zone: UTC+3:30 (IRST)

Anheh (Persian: انهه, also Romanized as Ānheh; also known as Aneh) is a village in Bala Larijan Rural District, Larijan District, Amol County, Mazandaran Province, Iran. At the 2006 census, its population was 88, in 29 families, up from 77 people in 2006.
