= Hassan Hassanzadeh Amoli =

Iranian Shi'ite theologian (1927–2021)

Allamah Hassan Hassanzadeh Amoli
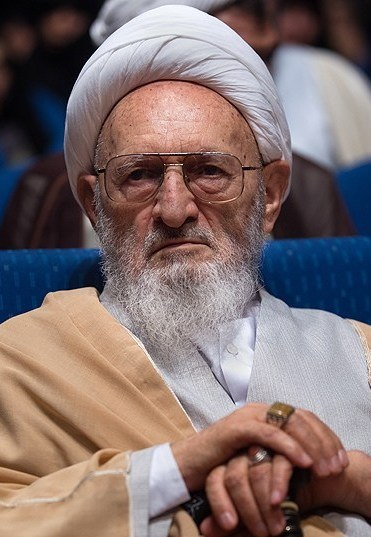
- Hasanzadeh Amoli at his own commemoration ceremony in 2013

Personal life
- Born: Hassan Hassanzadeh Tabari Amoli; 10 February 1929 Ira, Larijan, Imperial State of Persia
- Died: 25 September 2021 (aged 92) Amol, Iran

Religious life
- Religion: Islam
- Denomination: Shia
- Jurisprudence: Ja'fari
- Creed: Usuli

Hasan Hasanzade Amoli (Persian: حسن حسن‌زاده آملی: 10 February 1929 – 25 September 2021) was an Iranian Shi'ite theologian known for his mystical tendencies and Islamic philosophy. He was among clerics who overcame the traditional opposition to teaching philosophy courses at Shi'ite seminaries. He wrote many books in philosophy, mysticism, mathematics, astronomy, Persian and Arabic literature. He interpreted the Islamic philosophical tradition in a similar way to Mulla Sadra, which is a reconciliation of religion, reason and mysticism. His books include Sharh fusus al-hikam, Tashih nahj al-balagha, Insan dar 'urf-i 'irfan, Tashih kalila wa dimna.

He died on Saturday, 25 September 2021, at the age of 94. Iran's Supreme Leader Ayatollah Khamenei offered prayers on his body. Hassanzadeh Amoli was elected as one of the "Immortal figures of Iran" in 2003.

Hassanzadeh-Amoli was father-in-law of Iranian conservative politician Baqer Larijani.

== Biography ==
Allameh was born on February 10, 1929, in the village of Ira of Larijan and in 1944 he started to study in the Islamic seminary.

At the age of 22, he went to Tehran to continue his studies in 1950, and had teachers such as Ayatollah Agha Seyyed Ahmad Lavasani, Allameh Sha'rani, and in Marvi school, Allameh Haj Mirza Abolhassan Sha'rani Tehrani, Allameh Rafiei Qazvini, Ayatollah Ghomshei, Ayatollah Mohammad Taghi Amoli, Hakim Mohammad Hossein Fazel Toni, Ayatollah Haj Mirza Ahmad Ashtiani.

During these years, he studied interpretation, mathematics, astronomy, medicine. In 1963, he went to Qom and began teaching, and at the same time was a student of Allameh Tabatabai for 17 years. He also attended the philosophical and mystical lectures of Sayyid Muhammad Hasan Ilahi. Hasanzada speaks highly of these lectures, attributing part of his moral influence to them. He also studied with Sayyid Mahdi Qadi Tabataba'i, the son of Sayyid 'Ali Qadi Tabataba'i, who was an expert in Occult Sciences, philosophy, and mysticism.

Hassanzadeh Amoli considered the Qur'an as the source of divine knowledge. He believed that Nahj al-Balaghah, Sahifa al-Sajadiyya, Usul Kafi, Bihar al-Anwar and other narrative collections are rooted in the Qur'an and are expositions of the Qur'an. According to him, the sayings of the infallible Imams stem from the Qur'an.

According to Hassanzadeh, the Qur'an, philosophy and mysticism are not separate from each other. He considered the truth of religion and mysticism as one, and that is the knowledge of God.

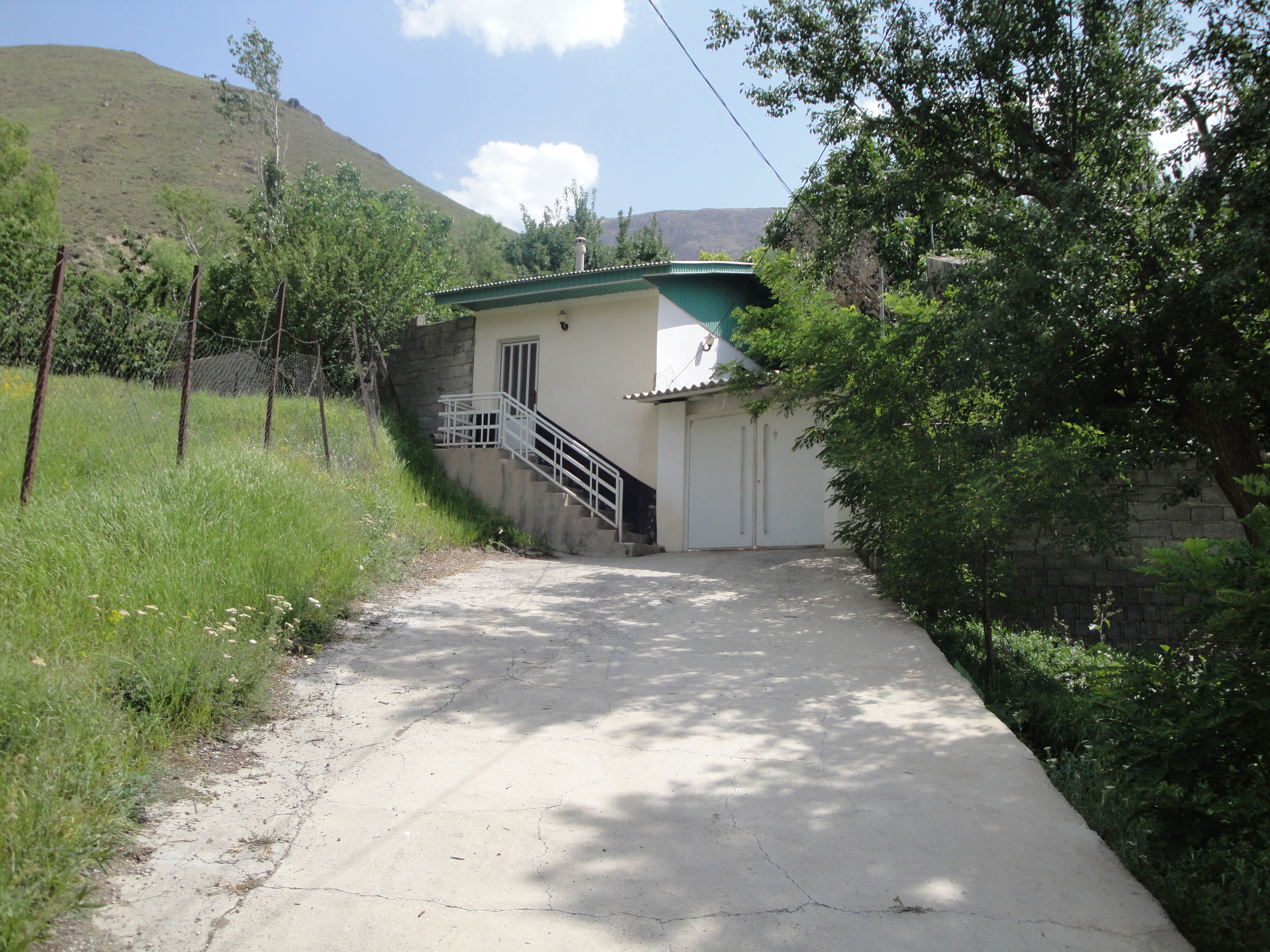
Hassan Hassanzadeh Amoli's house in Ira village, where he is also buried

== List of works ==
Hassanzadeh Amoli has works in the fields of jurisprudence, philosophy, ethics, mysticism, religious wisdom, theology, hadith and rijal, interpretation of the Qur'an, mathematics and astronomy, Arabic and Persian literature, natural sciences, ancient medicine, alien and esoteric sciences. Some of his works are:

Hizar-o-yik kalima

Hizar-o-yik nukta

Durus-i ma'rifat nafs

Ilahinama

Diwan-i ash'ar

Insan-i kamil az didgah-i nahj al-balagha

Insan dar 'urf-i 'irfan

Sad-o-dah eshareh

Wilayat takwini

Wahdat az nigah 'arif wa hakim

Gashti dar harkat

Risala nur 'ala nur dar zikr wa zakir wa madhkur

Risala anahu al-haq

sharh-i asfar

Medicine and dissection Translation and explanations of some of his books such as "The Beginning and The End", "100 Words" can be found here:

=== Politics ===
Amoli has been an outspoken supporter of Ayatollah Khomeini and his successor Ali Khamenei, dedicating the book Insan dar 'urf-i 'irfan (the human from the standpoint of mysticism) to the latter. Before June 6, 1963, he visited Ayatollah Khomeini and, on his orders, informed the political and social people of Amol. In the months leading up to the victory of the Revolution, he actively participated in the meetings of the Clergy Society of Mazandaran Province. He also was on the battlefield during the Holy Defense.
