= Fireh =

Fireh فيره
- Village
- Location within Iran
- Coordinates: 35°56′28″N 52°14′41″E
- Country: Iran
- Province: Mazandaran
- County: Amol
- Bakhsh: Larijan
- Rural District: Bala Larijan

Population (2006)
  - Total: 63
- Time zone: UTC+3:30 (IRST)

Fireh (Persian: فيره, also Romanized as Fīreh and Firah; also known as Fīreh Delārestāq) is a village in Bala Larijan Rural District, Larijan District, Amol County, Mazandaran Province, Iran. At the 2016 census, its population was 33, in 16 families, down from 63 people in 2006.
