= Akhazir =

Akhazir آخازير
- Village
- Location within Iran
- Coordinates: 35°55′20″N 52°16′57″E
- Country: Iran
- Province: Mazandaran
- County: Amol
- Bakhsh: Larijan
- Rural District: Bala Larijan

Population (2006)
  - Total: 48
- Time zone: UTC+3:30 (IRST)

Akhazir (Persian: آخازير, also Romanized as Ākhāzīr) is a village in Bala Larijan Rural District, Larijan District, Amol County, Mazandaran Province, Iran. At the 2016 census, its population was 36, in 12 families, down from 48 people in 2006.
