= Nahar, Mazandaran =

Nahar نهر
- Village
- Location within Iran
- Coordinates: 35°55′18″N 52°18′00″E
- Country: Iran
- Province: Mazandaran
- County: Amol
- Bakhsh: Larijan
- Rural District: Bala Larijan

Population (2016)
  - Total: 45
- Time zone: UTC+3:30 (IRST)

Nahar (Persian: نهر) is a village in Bala Larijan Rural District, Larijan District, Amol County, Mazandaran Province, Iran. At the 2016 census, its population was 45, in 16 families. Up from 31 people in 2006.
