= Shahandasht =

Shahan Dasht شوندشت شاهاندشت
- Village
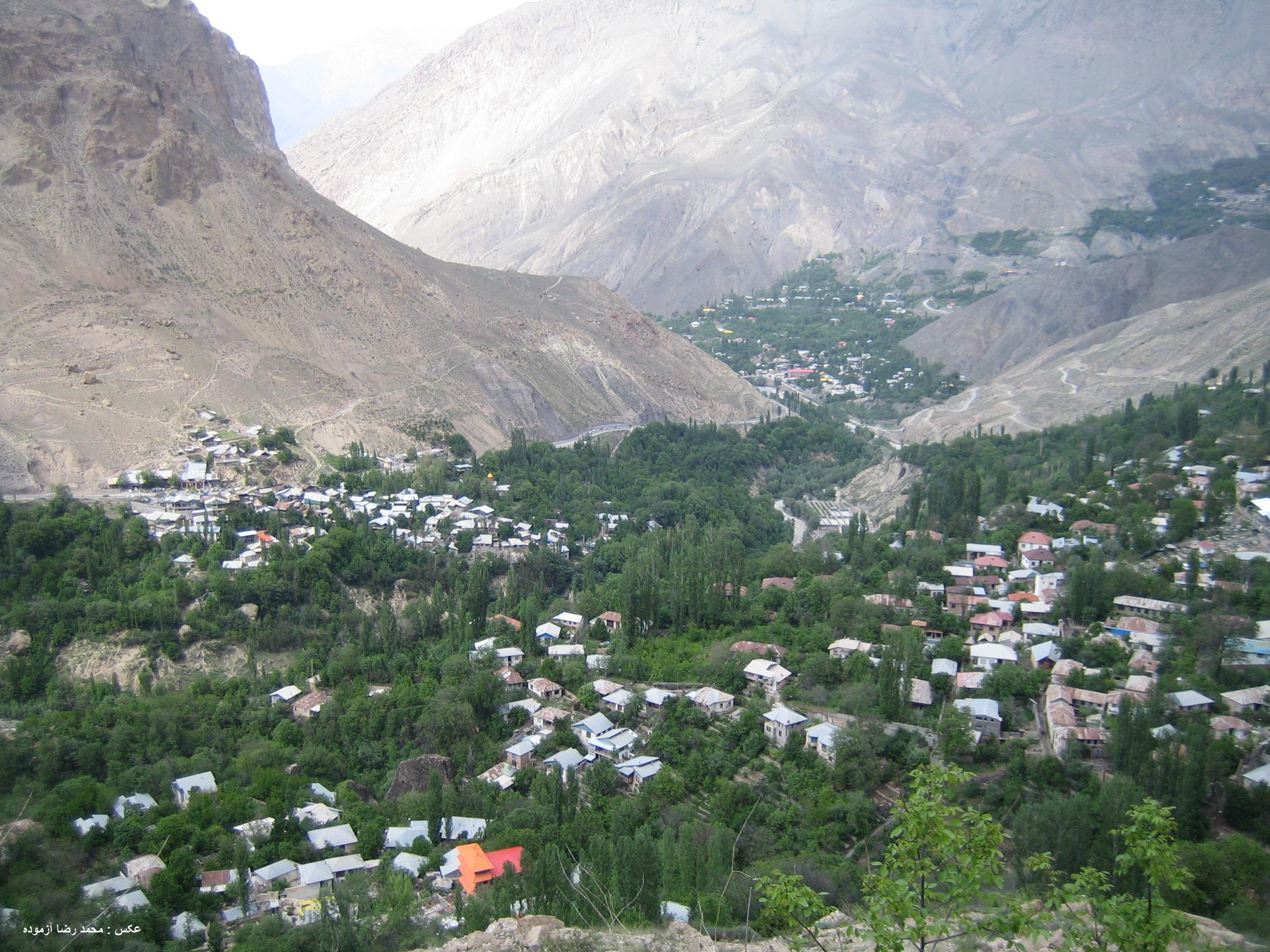
- Haraz river valley, with Shahan Dasht at the bottom

- Location within Iran
- Coordinates: 35°54′44″N 52°15′38″E
- Country: Iran
- Province: Mazandaran
- County: Amol
- Bakhsh: Larijan
- Rural District: Bala Larijan

Population (2016)
  - Total: 69
- Time zone: UTC+3:30 (IRST)

Shahan Dasht (Persian: شاهاندشت or شاهان‌دشت, also Romanized as Shāhān Dasht or Shahandasht), locally known as Shoon Dasht (Mazanderani: شوندشت), is a village in Bala Larijan Rural District, Larijan District, Amol County, Mazandaran province, Iran.

At the 2016 census, its population was 69, in 31 households.

The Shahan Dasht waterfall is a natural attraction of the province. The Malek Bahman castle is also a historical castle attracting visitors in the village.

The Persian name Shahan Dasht is composed of the word shah (Persian: شاه), meaning king , the plural suffix -an (Persian: ـان) , and the word dasht (Persian: دشت), meaning field , and hence it literally translates as "field of the kings" in Persian.

== Mosque (Tekiyeh/ local dialect) of Shahandasht ==
It belongs to the Qajar period and is located in Amol city, Larijan district, Shahandasht village and this monoument was registered as one of the national monuments of Iran on August 28, 2003, with the registration number 9354.

== Shahandasht waterfall ==
Shahan Dasht waterfall

It is one of the national monuments of the country in the list of "Iran National Monuments". This waterfall has three waterfalls which the total height of them are 180 meters. At the top of Shahandasht waterfall is Malek Bahman Castle, which is known as Queen Qala Castle or Malek Bahman and its historical name is Fereshteh (queen in Persian) Castle.

== Si tower (30 in Persian) ==
It belongs to pre-Islamic times and it is located in the village of Shahandasht, Amol city, Larijan district, and this monoument was registered on August 28, 2003, with the registration number 9356 as one of the national monuments of Iran.

== Malek Bahman Castle ==
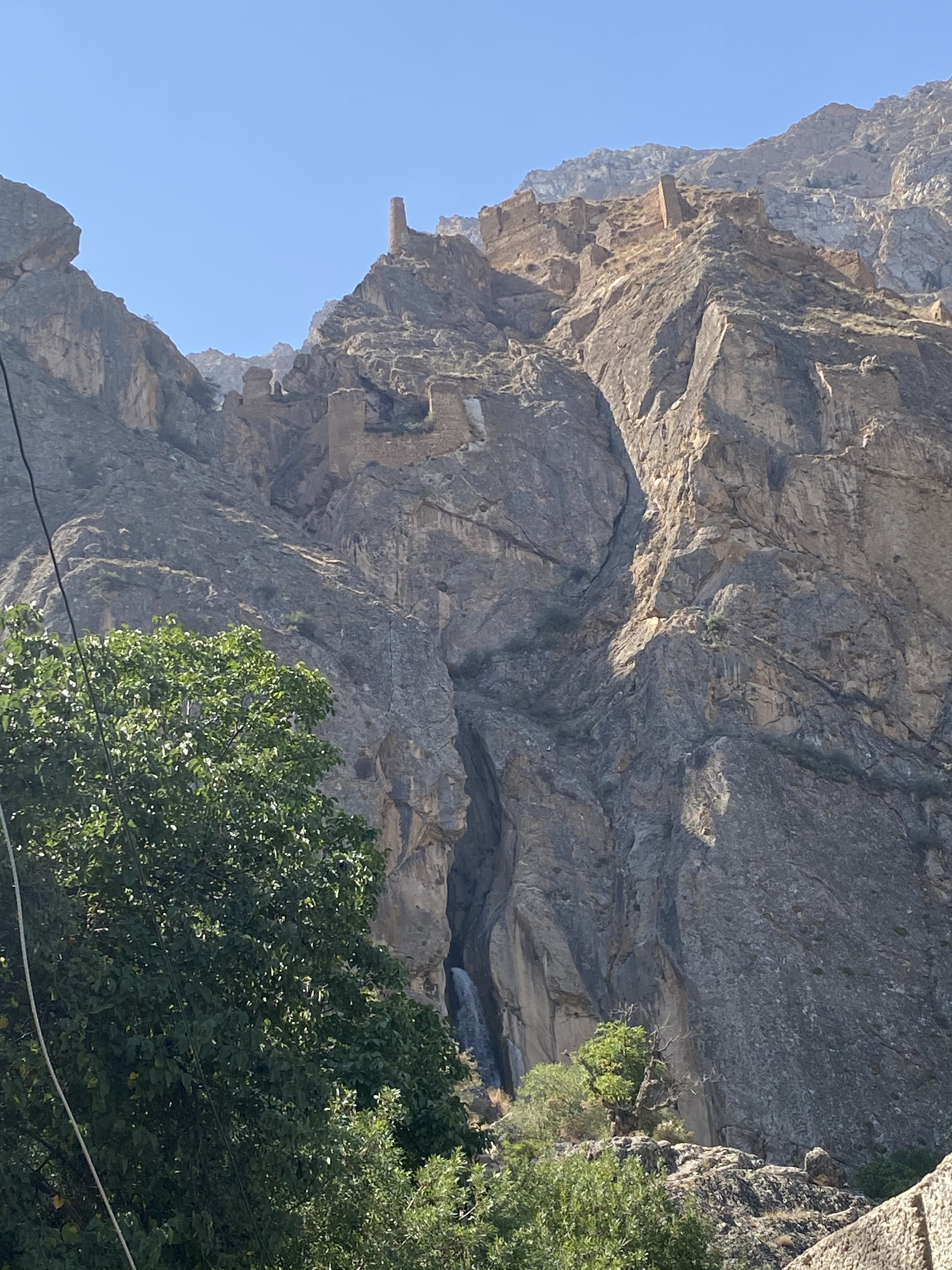

Malek Bahman Or Malek Qala castle belongs to pre-Islamic times and it is located in the village of Shahandasht, Amol city, Larijan district, and this monoument was registered as one of the national monuments of Iran on August 10, 2000, with the registration number 2778

== Elias Tangeh Cave ==
Elias Tangeh Cave is located in 85 km northeast of Tehran, 75 km south of Amol city in Shahandasht village. The use of the name As Tangeh Cave is common among the people of the region. The cave is located on the southwestern slope of Elias Tangeh valley. There is a dirt road of livestock crossing about 2 km in the distance between Shahandasht village To the entrance of the cave.
