= Kandelu =

Village in Mazandaran province, Iran

Kandelu Persian: كندلو
- Village
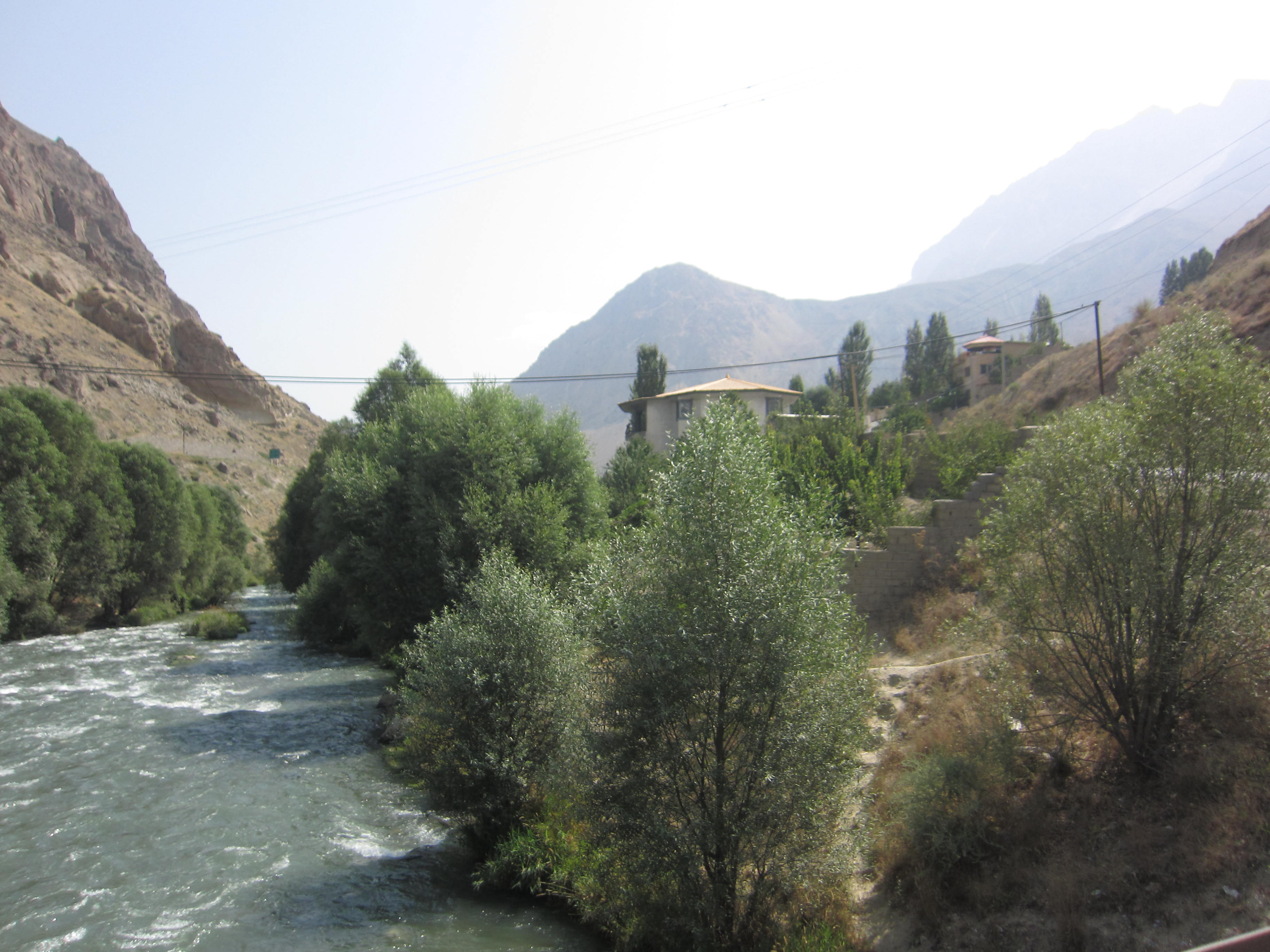
- The village of Kandelu in August 2014

- Location within Iran
- Coordinates: 35°53′15″N 52°12′17″E
- Country: Iran
- Province: Mazandaran
- County: Amol
- District: Larijan
- Rural District: Bala Larijan

Population (2016)
  - Total: 105
- Time zone: UTC+3:30 (IRST)

Kandelu (Persian: كندلو) (Note: Also romanized as Kandelū and Kāndolū) is a village in Bala Larijan Rural District of Larijan District in Amol County, Mazandaran province, Iran.

== Demographics ==
=== Population ===
At the time of the 2006 National Census, the village's population was 69 in 22 households. The following census in 2011 counted 85 people in 33 households. The 2016 census measured the population of the village as 105 people in 43 households.
