= Larin, Iran =

Larin لارین
- Village
- Location within Iran
- Coordinates: 35°55′9.869″N 52°18′17.593″E
- Country: Iran
- Province: Mazandaran
- County: Amol
- Bakhsh: Larijan
- Rural District: Bala Larijan
- Elevation: 1,850 m (6,070 ft)

Population (2016)
  - Total: 38
- Time zone: UTC+3:30 (IRST)

Larin (Persian: لارین, also Romanized as Lārin) is a mountainous village in Bala Larijan Rural District, Larijan District, Amol County, Mazandaran Province, Iran, located 21 km (13 mi) northeast of Rineh city and 4 km (2.5 mi) east of Haraz Road. The village is in the central Alborz range in a valley called "Amiri" region. Its economy is based on farming and gardening and its main products are cereal, walnut, cherry, apple, peach and nectarine.

At the 2016 census, its population was 38, in 21 households.

== Demographics ==
The native people of Larin speak Mazandarani with Amoli dialect.

At the 1966 census, Larin was in Amiri Rural District of Larijan District. During that census mosque, and elementary school, but had no power supply and healthcare facility. At the 1986 census, Larin had tap water.

Larin population history
Year	Pop.	±%
1950	35	—
1956	33	−5.7%
1966	24	−27.3%
1976	32	+33.3%
1986	35	+9.4%
2011	15	−57.1%
2016	38	+153.3%
