= Gilas =

Gilas گيلاس
- Village
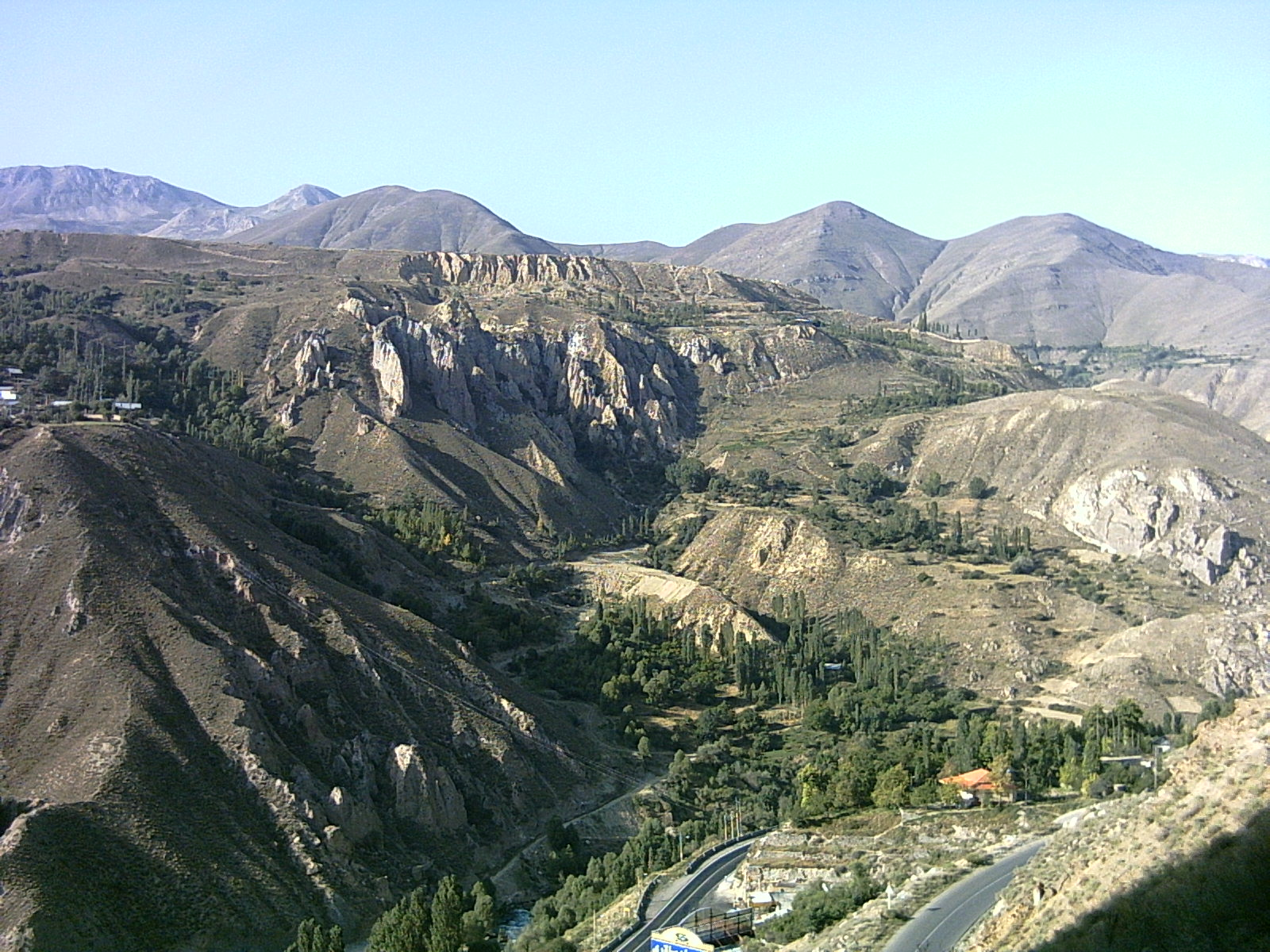
- Gilas and Haraz Road

- Location within Iran
- Coordinates: 35°52′56″N 52°12′04″E
- Country: Iran
- Province: Mazandaran
- County: Amol
- Bakhsh: Larijan
- Rural District: Bala Larijan

Population (2016)
  - Total: 77
- Time zone: UTC+3:30 (IRST)

Gilas (Persian: گيلاس, also Romanized as Gīlās) is a village in Bala Larijan Rural District, Larijan District, Amol County, Mazandaran Province, Iran. At the 2016 census, its population was 77 distributed in 26 families, up from 11 people in 2006.
