= Amirabad, Amol =

Amirabad اميرآباد
- Village
- Location within Iran
- Coordinates: 35°54′24″N 52°11′58″E
- Country: Iran
- Province: Mazandaran
- County: Amol
- Bakhsh: Larijan
- Rural District: Bala Larijan

Population (2016)
  - Total: 65
- Time zone: UTC+3:30 (IRST)

Amirabad (Persian: اميرآباد, also Romanized as Amīrābād; also known as Shahīdābād) is a village in Bala Larijan Rural District, Larijan District, Amol County, Mazandaran Province, Iran. According to the 2016 census, its population was 65, in 17 families, up from 60 people in 2006.
