= Bala Larijan Rural District =

Rural district in Mazandaran province, Iran

Bala Larijan Rural District Persian: دهستان بالا لاريجان
- Rural District
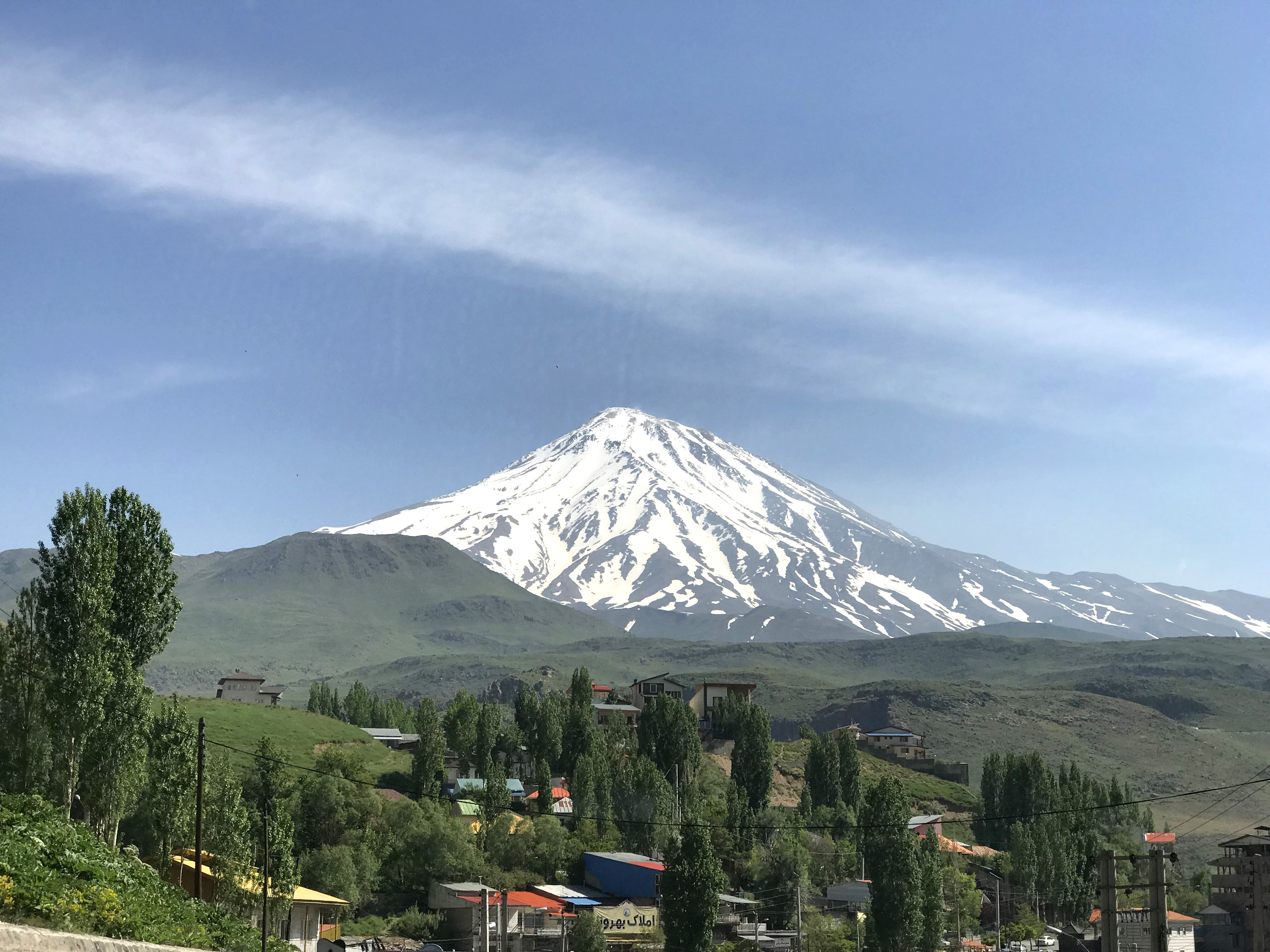
- Mt. Damavand

- Location within Iran
- Coordinates: 35°53′N 52°08′E
- Country: Iran
- Province: Mazandaran
- County: Amol
- District: Larijan
- Established: 1987
- Capital: Gazanak

Population (2016)
  - Total: 3,746
- Time zone: UTC+3:30 (IRST)

Bala Larijan Rural District (Persian: دهستان بالا لاريجان) is in Larijan District of Amol County, Mazandaran province, Iran. It is administered from the city of Gazanak.

== Demographics ==
=== Population ===
At the time of the 2006 National Census, the rural district's population was 4,043 in 1,169 households. There were 2,992 inhabitants in 999 households at the following census of 2011. The 2016 census measured the population of the rural district as 3,746 in 1,398 households. The most populous of its 43 villages was Ab Ask, with 454 people.

=== Other villages in the rural district ===
- Ab-e Garm
- Abbas Abad
- Afsaneh Sara
- Akha
- Akhazir
- Amirabad
- Anheh
- Dinan
- Fireh
- Garna
- Gazaneh
- Gilas
- Gol Pasha
- Hareh
- Ira
- Kamp-e Sad Lar
- Kandelu
- Kenar Anjam
- Ketel Emamzadeh Hashem
- Larin
- Lasem
- Lazirak
- Malar
- Nahar
- Neva
- Niak
- Pol-e Mun
- Polur
- Shahan Dasht
- Shamsabad
- Shangoldeh
- Tara
- Vana
- Zeyar
