= Ziyar, Mazandaran =

Ziyar زيار
- Village
- Location within Iran
- Coordinates: 35°50′16″N 52°06′11″E
- Country: Iran
- Province: Mazandaran
- County: Amol
- Bakhsh: Larijan
- Rural District: Bala Larijan

Population (2016)
  - Total: 62
- Time zone: UTC+3:30 (IRST)

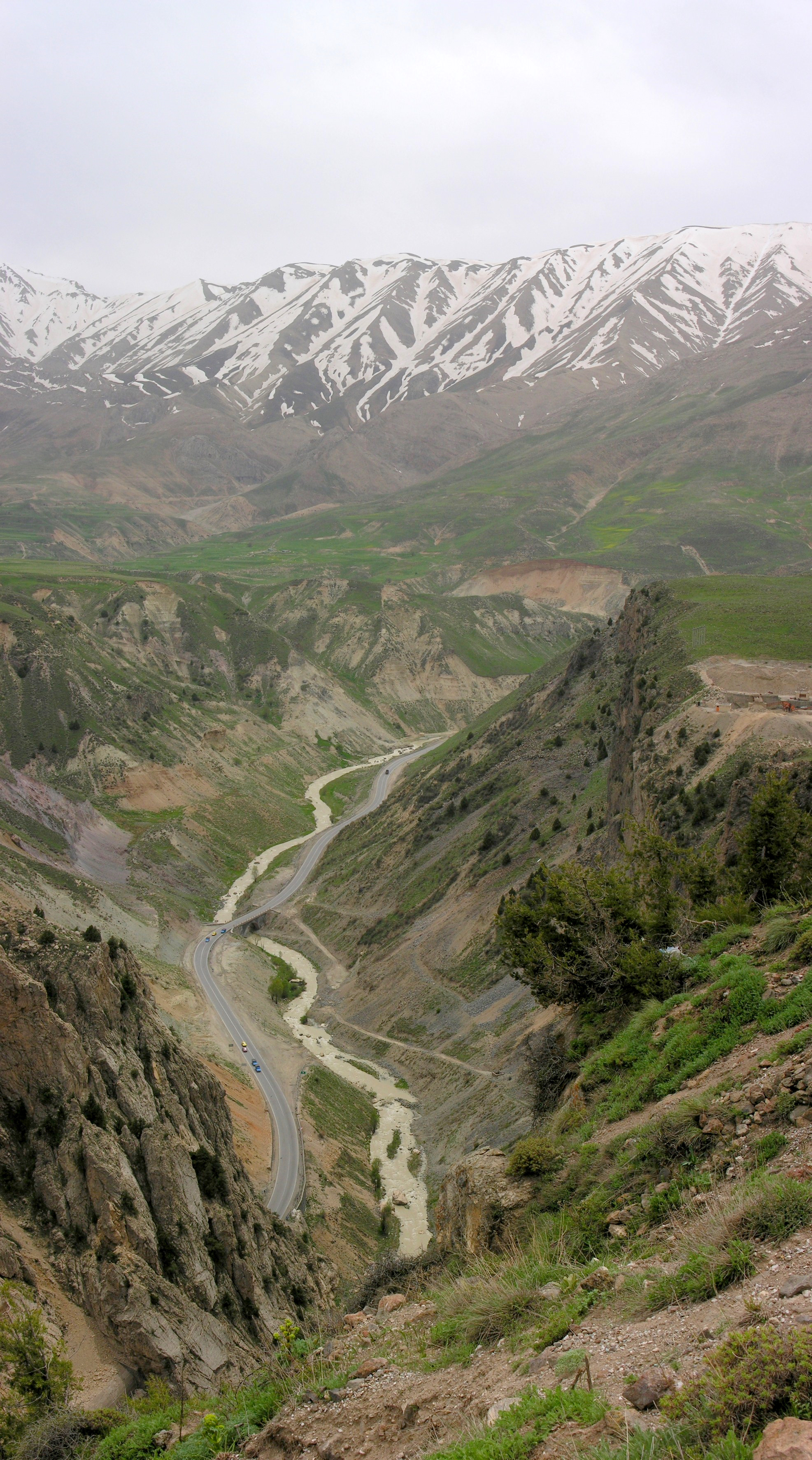
Country around Ziyar.

Ziyar (Persian: زيار, also Romanized as Zeyār) is a village in Bala Larijan Rural District, Larijan District, Amol County, Mazandaran Province, Iran. At the 2016 census, its population was 62, in 22 families. Up from 50 in 2006.
