= Shamsabad, Amol =

Shamsabad شمس آباد
- Village
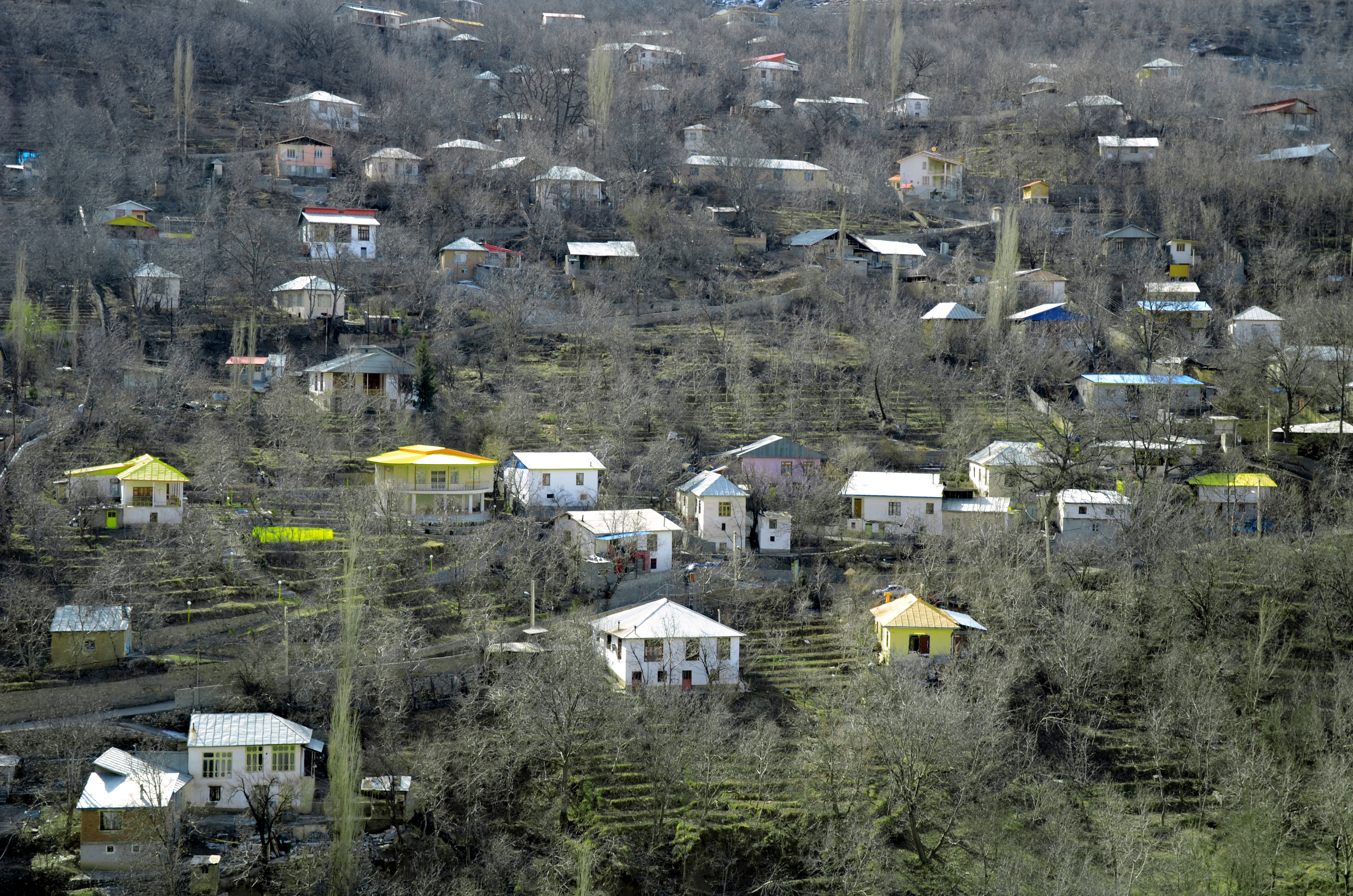

- Location within Iran
- Coordinates: 35°55′07″N 52°17′07″E
- Country: Iran
- Province: Mazandaran
- County: Amol
- Bakhsh: Larijan
- Rural District: Bala Larijan

Population (2016)
  - Total: 86
- Time zone: UTC+3:30 (IRST)

Shamsabad (Persian: شمس آباد, also Romanized as Shamsābād) is a village in Bala Larijan Rural District, Larijan District, Amol County, Mazandaran Province, Iran. At the 2016 census, its population was 86, in 35 families. Down from 133 people in 2006.
