= Malar, Mazandaran =

Malar ملار
- Village
- Location within Iran
- Coordinates: 35°55′30″N 52°11′34″E
- Country: Iran
- Province: Mazandaran
- County: Amol
- Bakhsh: Larijan
- Rural District: Bala Larijan

Population (2016)
  - Total: 9
- Time zone: UTC+3:30 (IRST)

Malar (Persian: ملار, also Romanized as Malār) is a village in Bala Larijan Rural District, Larijan District, Amol County, Mazandaran Province, Iran. At the 2016 census, its population was 9, in 5 families. Decreased from 40 people in 2006.
