= Ketel Emamzadeh Hashem =

Ketel Emamzadeh Hashem كتل امامزاده هاشم
- village
- Location within Iran
- Coordinates: 35°46′47″N 52°02′19″E
- Country: Iran
- Province: Mazandaran
- county: Amol
- District: Larijan
- Rural District: Bala Larijan

Population (2006)
  - Total: 14
- Time zone: UTC+3:30 (IRST)

Ketel Emamzadeh Hashem (Persian: كتل امامزاده هاشم), also Romanized as Kotal Emāmzādeh Hāshem, is a village in Amol County, Mazandaran Province, Iran. At the 2006 census, its population was 14, in 5 families. In 2016, the recorded population was 0.
