= Garna =

Village in Mazandaran province, Iran

Garna Persian: گرنا
- Village
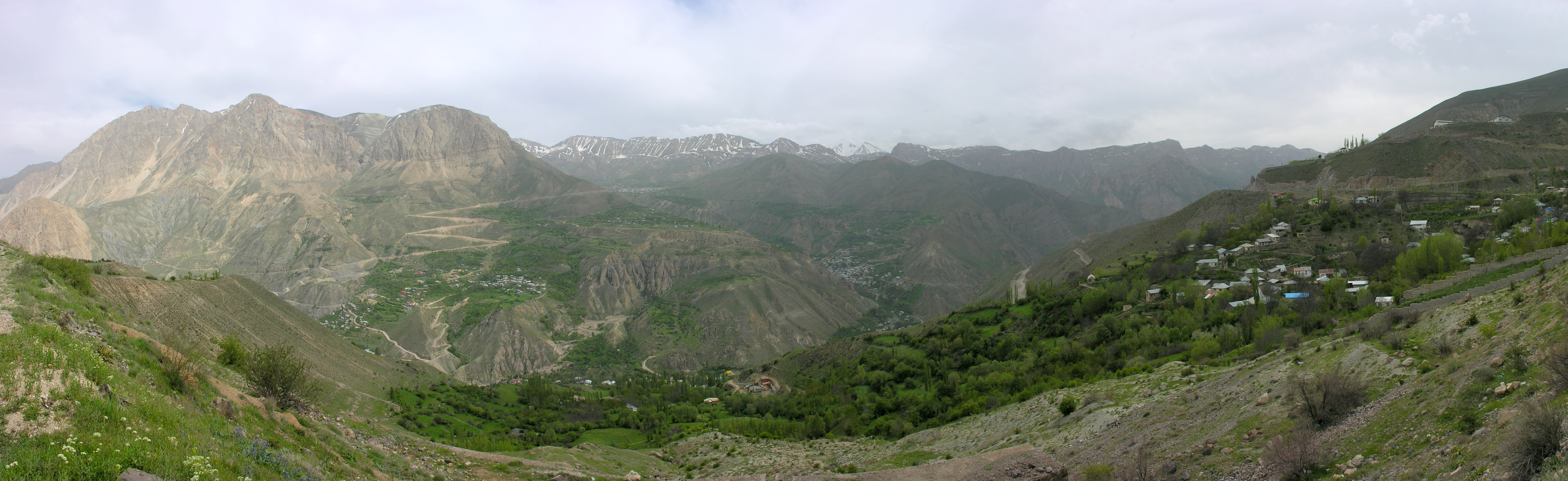
- Panoramic view of the village of Garna

- Location within Iran
- Coordinates: 35°53′42″N 52°10′57″E
- Country: Iran
- Province: Mazandaran
- County: Amol
- District: Larijan
- Rural District: Bala Larijan

Population (2016)
  - Total: 184
- Time zone: UTC+3:30 (IRST)

Garna (Persian: گرنا) (Note: Also romanized as Garnā; also known as Gaznā) is a village in Bala Larijan Rural District of Larijan District in Amol County, Mazandaran province, Iran.

== Demographics ==
=== Population ===
At the time of the 2006 National Census, the village's population was 67 in 21 households. The following census in 2011 counted 48 people in 17 households. The 2016 census measured the population of the village as 184 people in 61 households.
