= Gol Pasha =

Gol Pasha گل پاشا
- Village
- Location within Iran
- Coordinates: 35°55′15″N 52°16′58″E
- Country: Iran
- Province: Mazandaran
- County: Amol
- Bakhsh: Larijan
- Rural District: Bala Larijan

Population (2016)
  - Total: 80
- Time zone: UTC+3:30 (IRST)

Gol Pasha (Persian: گل پاشا, also Romanized as Gol Pāshā; also known as Kal Pāshā Mey-e Soflá and Kal Pāshā-ye Soflá) is a village in Bala Larijan Rural District, Larijan District, Amol County, Mazandaran Province, Iran. At the 2016 census, its population was 80, in 29 families. Up from 36 people in 2006.
