= Ira, Mazandaran =

Ira ایرا
- Village
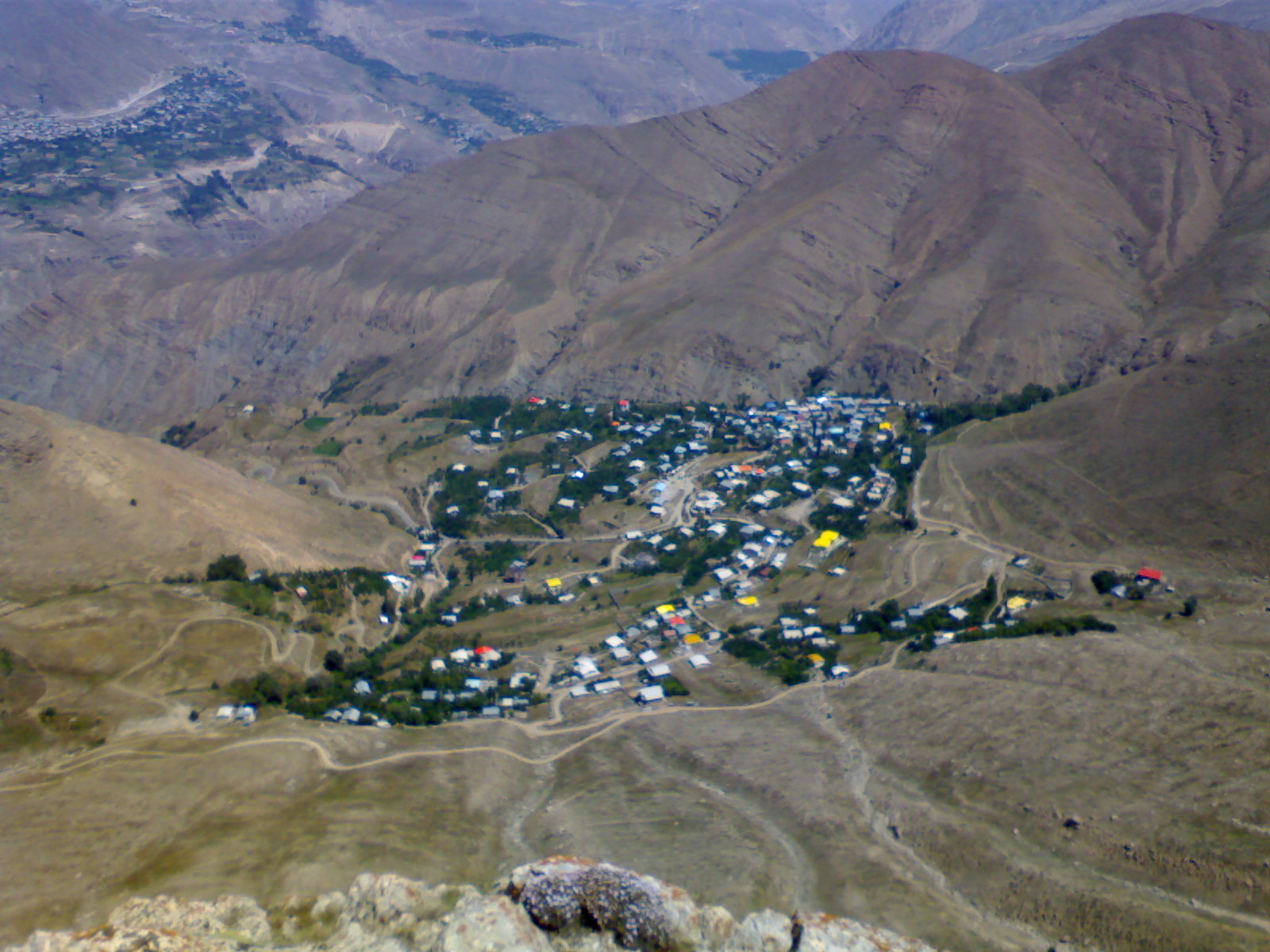

- Location within Iran
- Coordinates: 35°51′09″N 52°10′24″E
- Country: Iran
- Province: Mazandaran
- County: Amol
- Bakhsh: Larijan
- Rural District: Bala Larijan

Population (2016)
  - Total: 69
- Time zone: UTC+3:30 (IRST)
- Website: ira.ir

Ira (Persian: ایرا, also Romanized as Īrā; also known as Iza) is a village in Bala Larijan Rural District, Larijan District, Amol County, Mazandaran province, Iran. At the 2016 census, its population was 69, in 29 families, up from 15 people in 2006.

Iranian Cleric & Politician Hassan Hassanzadeh Amoli is from this village.
