= Ab Ask =

Village in Mazandaran province, Iran

Ab Ask Persian: آب اسک
- Village
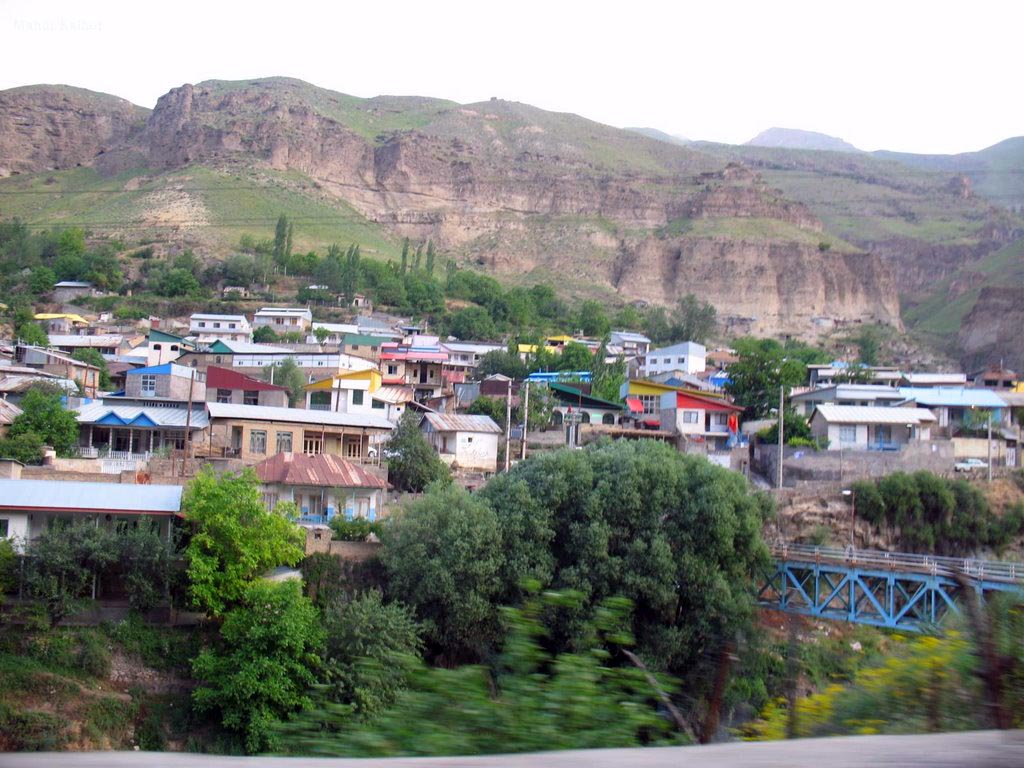
- The village of Ab Ask

- Location within Iran
- Coordinates: 35°52′12″N 52°09′17″E
- Country: Iran
- Province: Mazandaran
- County: Amol
- District: Larijan
- Rural District: Bala Larijan

Population (2016)
  - Total: 454
- Time zone: UTC+3:30 (IRST)

Ab Ask (Persian: آب اسک) (Note: Also romanized as Āb-e Ask; also known as Ask) is a village in Bala Larijan Rural District of Larijan District in Amol County, Mazandaran province, Iran.

== Demographics ==
=== Population ===
At the time of the 2006 National Census, the village's population was 581 in 170 households. The following census in 2011 counted 387 people in 133 households. The 2016 census measured the population of the village as 454 people in 158 households. It was the most populous village in its rural district.

== History ==
Ab Ask was a fairly old settlement in Larijan, being mentioned by Ibn Isfandiyar in 1216. Remainders of caves around the settlement can still be found, considered to have potentially been ancient village remnants. Some were used to store livestock within. These caves are also mentioned in 1882, as homes for the villagers.

== overview ==
Ab Ask is famous for its mineral hot springs sources from Mount Damavand, the highest peak in Iran, with an elevation of 5610 m above sea level. Agriculture and livestock are the main occupation of local residents.

Ab Ask is also a very popular fishing spot with an ample amount of red-spot trout fish. The majority of Amol's population is originally from Larijan District, and those from Ab Ask are known as Aski.

Most of the Aski people in Amol own a property in Ab Ask and spend their weekends there, specifically during spring and summer when the weather is quite cool and pleasant by driving about an hour over the Haraz Road.

== Barf-Chāl ==
In mid-spring, a historical festival called "Barf-Chāl" (برف چال، literally snow cavity) is held in Ab Ask every year. During the festives, Ab Aski men gather around outside the village and together, they bury piles of snow on pre-digged cavities on the southern slope of Damavand, in order to use the ice on summertime. While men are doing that vital task, Ab Aski women hold a ceremonial festive, called Zan-Shahi (زن‌شاهی, literally Queenship); they chose shah, vizier and guards amongst themselves and temporarily govern the village, while joyfully mocking their husbands for not being equally qualified. During this female-only festival, no male person is allowed to enter the village.

== Gallery ==
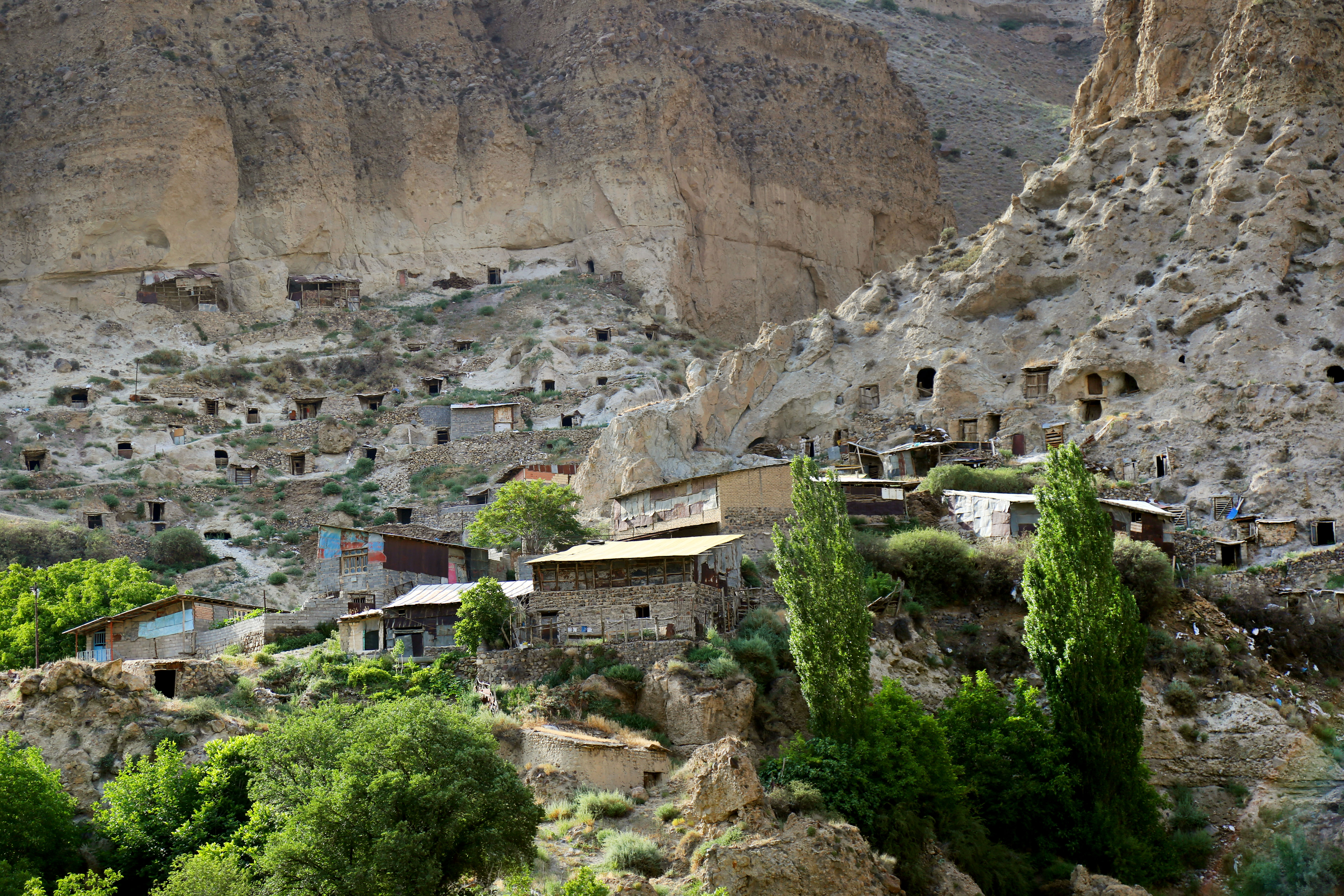
Ab Ask, Mazandaran, Iran

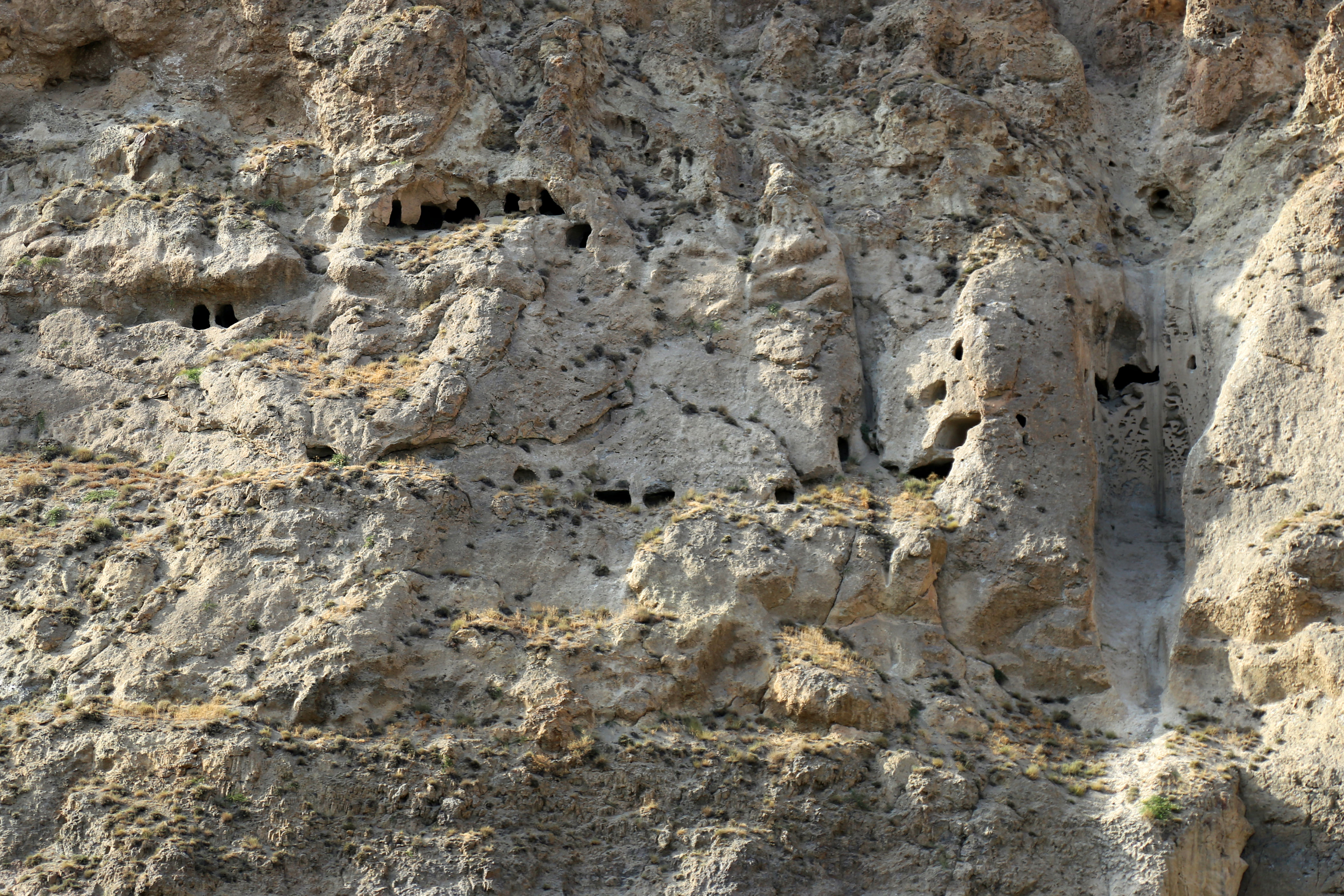
Ab Ask, Mazandaran, Iran

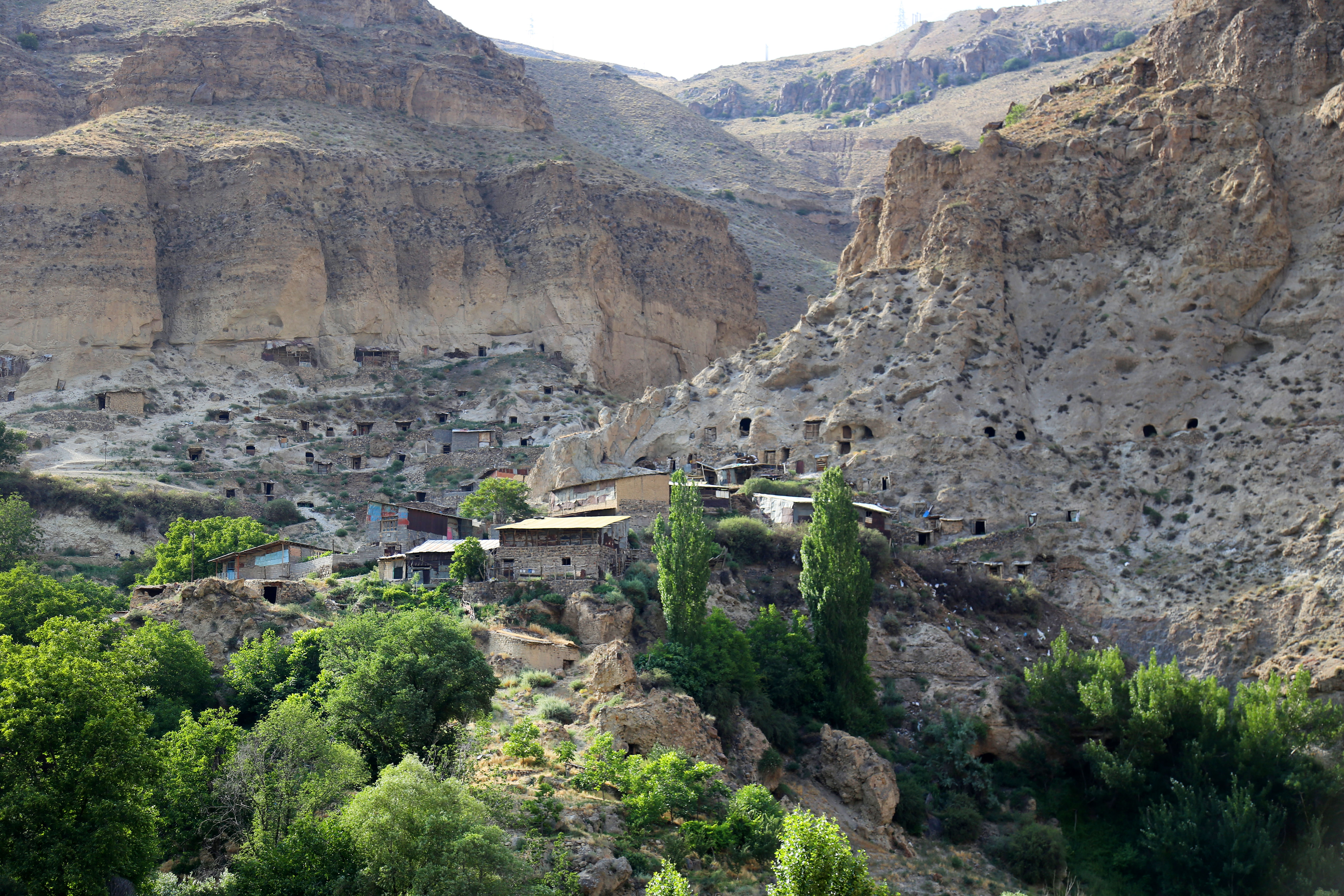
Ab Ask, Mazandaran, Iran

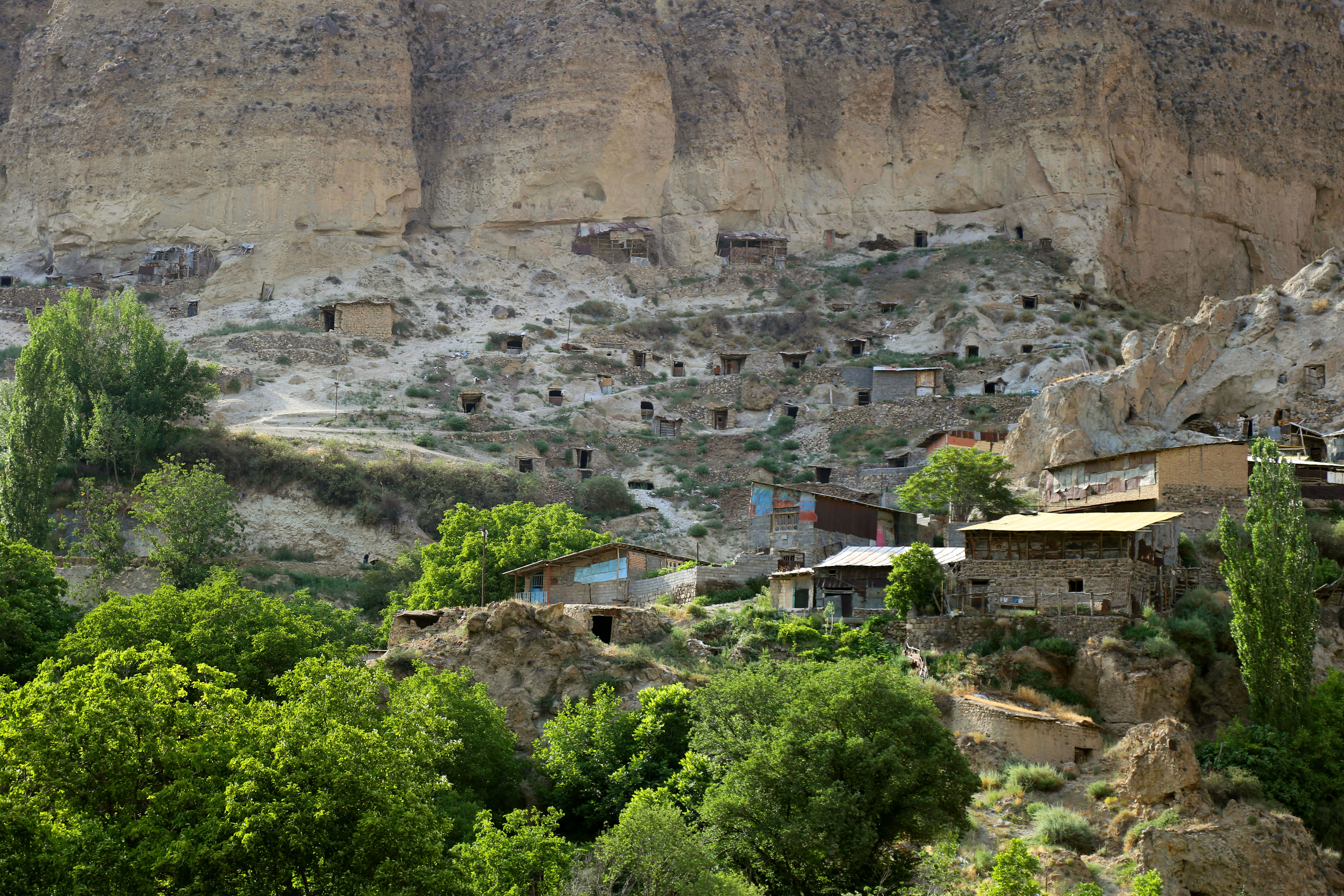
Ab Ask, Mazandaran, Iran
