= Pol-e Mun =

Pol-e Moun پلمون
- Village
- Location within Iran
- Coordinates: 35°53′00″N 52°12′00″E
- Country: Iran
- Province: Mazandaran
- County: Amol
- Bakhsh: Larijan
- Rural District: Bala Larijan

Population (2016)
  - Total: 42
- Time zone: UTC+3:30 (IRST)

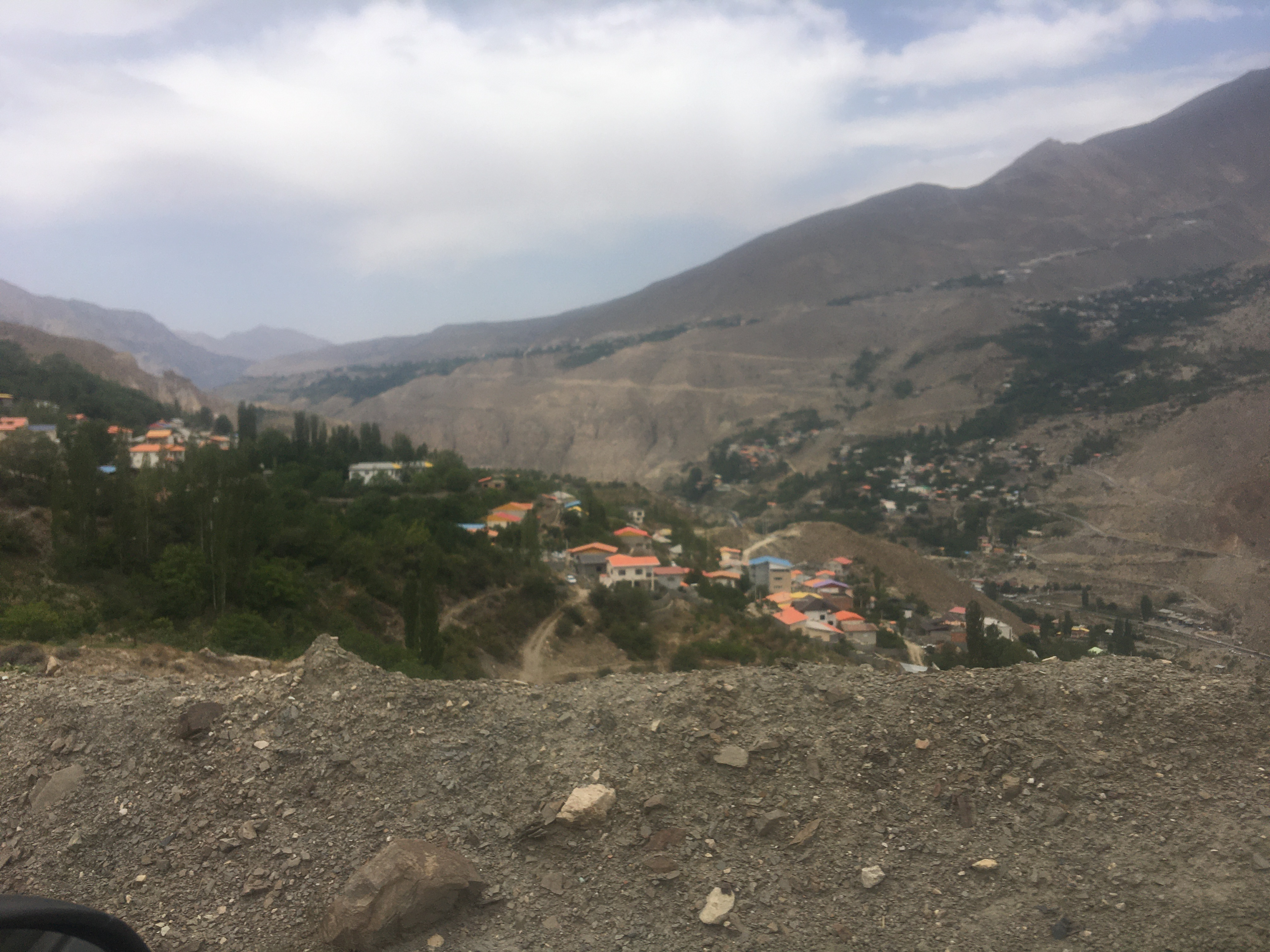
Pol Mun village, Mazandaran, Iran

Pol-e Moun (Persian: پلمون, also Romanized as Pol-e Mūn; also known as Pol-e Sūn) is a village in Bala Larijan Rural District, Larijan District, Amol County, Mazandaran Province, Iran. At the 2016 census, its population was 42, in 19 families. Decreased from 141 people in 2006.
