= Akkaş =

Akkaş is a Turkish surname, it also exists in Lebanon as dakkaş in Mount Lebanon governorate and Eastern part of the capital Beirut. In Turkey the family is concentrated in the central provinces (Nevşehir, Konya, Kayseri, and Ankara) as well as in İstanbul (Kadıköy and Üsküdar) and İzmir on the Aegean sea. Notable people with the surname include:

- Barbaros Akkaş (born 1976), Turkish basketball coach
- Halil Akkaş (born 1983), Turkish middle-distance runner

== See also ==
- Akkas (name)
