= Vana, Iran =

Village in Mazandaran province, Iran

Vana Persian: وانا
- Village
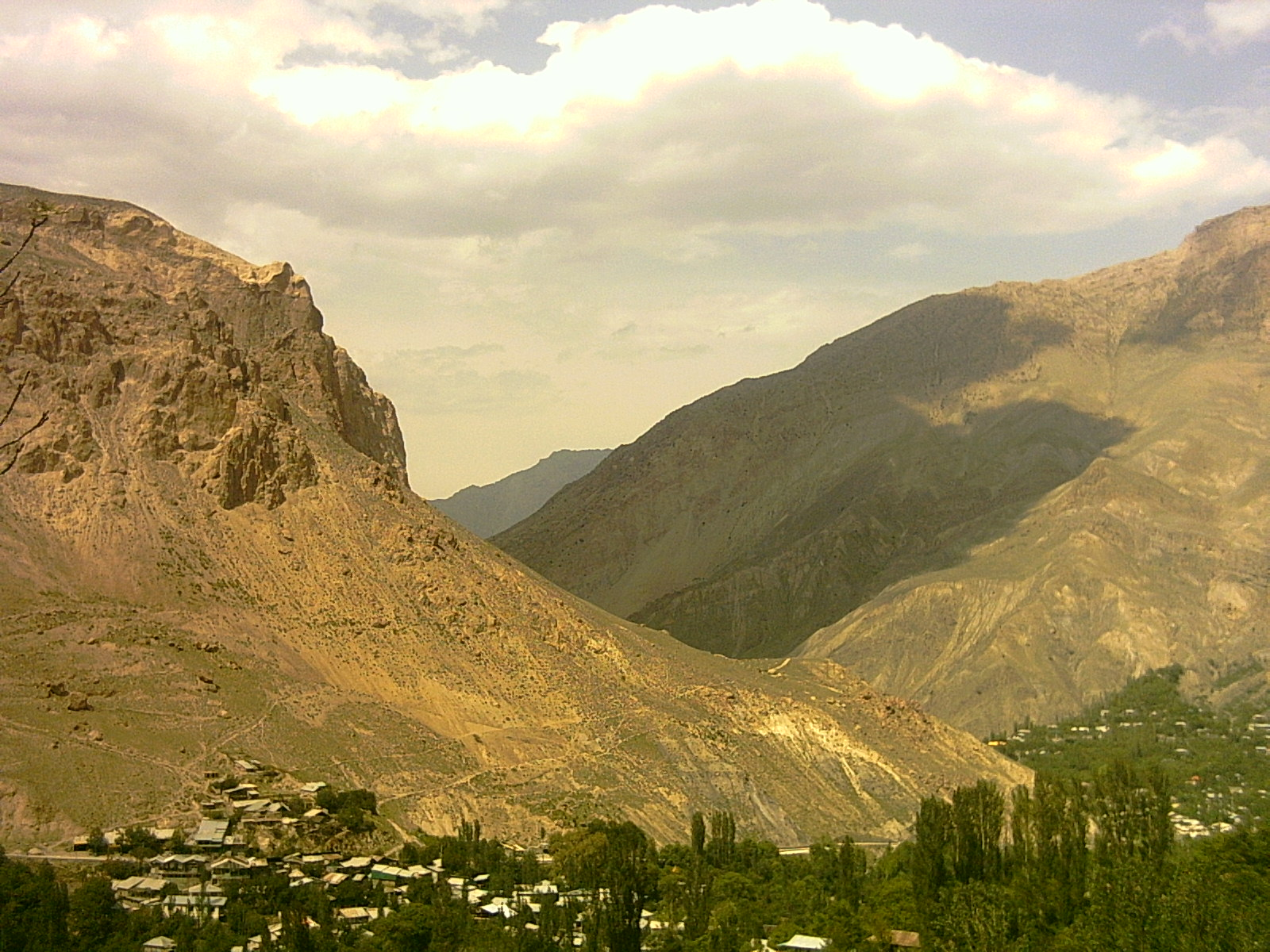
- The village of Vana

- Location within Iran
- Coordinates: 35°55′26″N 52°16′04″E
- Country: Iran
- Province: Mazandaran
- County: Amol
- District: Larijan
- Rural District: Bala Larijan

Population (2016)
  - Total: 231
- Time zone: UTC+3:30 (IRST)

Vana (Persian: وانا) (Note: Also romanized as Vānā; also known as Vāneh and Wahna) is a village in Bala Larijan Rural District of Larijan District in Amol County, Mazandaran province, Iran.

== Demographics ==
=== Population ===
At the time of the 2006 National Census, the village's population was 304 in 89 households. The following census in 2011 counted 273 people in 48 households. The 2016 census measured the population of the village as 231 people in 73 households.
