= Kenar Anjam =

Kenar Anjam كنارانجام
- Village
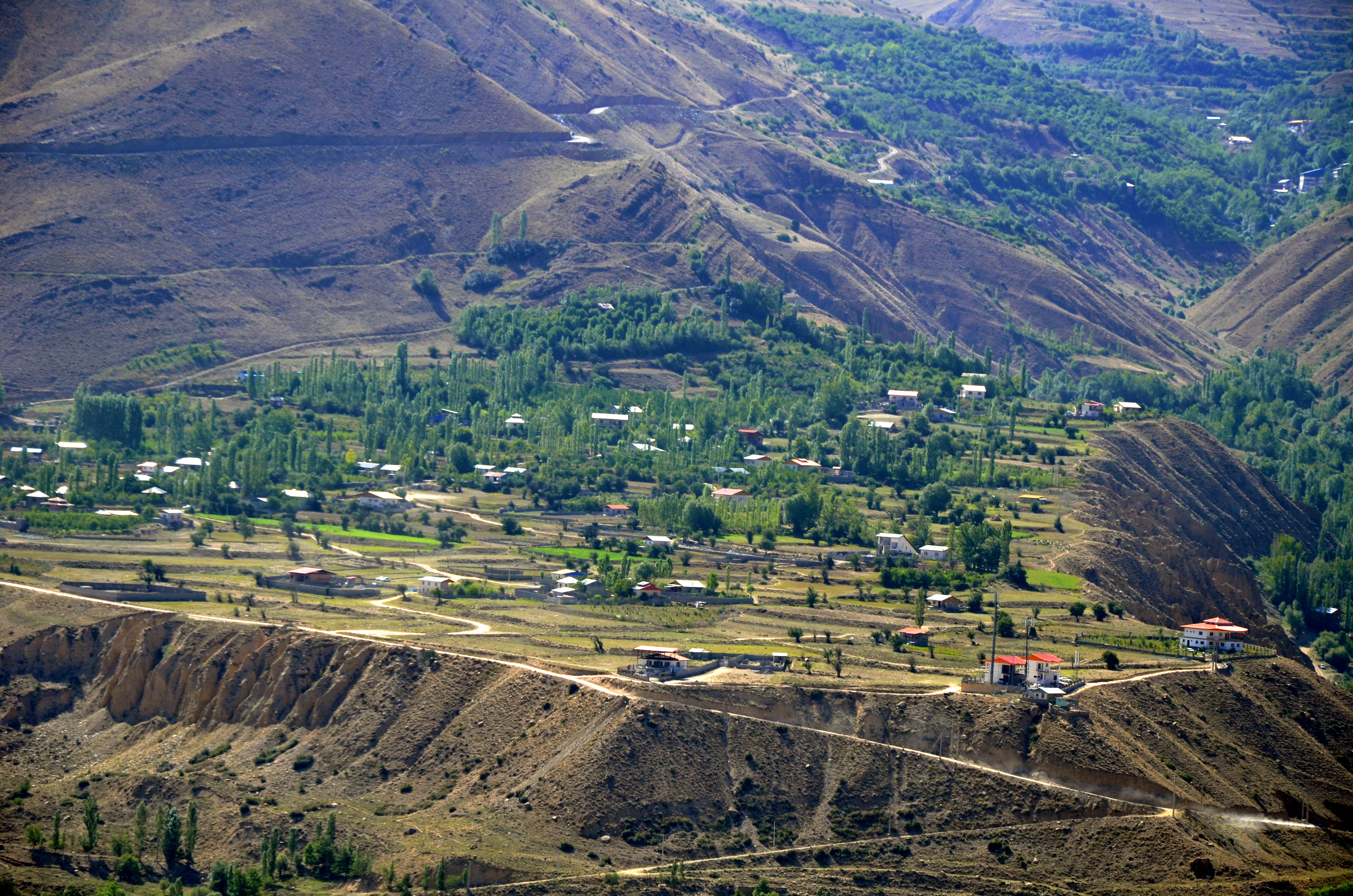

- Location within Iran
- Coordinates: 35°52′10″N 52°11′50″E
- Country: Iran
- Province: Mazandaran
- County: Amol
- Bakhsh: Larijan
- Rural District: Bala Larijan

Population (2006)
  - Total: 50
- Time zone: UTC+3:30 (IRST)

Kenar Anjam (Persian: كنارانجام, also Romanized as Kenār Anjām) is a village in Bala Larijan Rural District, Larijan District, Amol County, Mazandaran Province, Iran. At the 2016 census, its population was 50, in 21 families. Down from 59 in 2006.
