= Aka Nanitashvili =

Georgian fashion designer

- აკა ნანიტაშვილი
- Born: 1978 (age 47–48); Tbilisi, Georgia
- Education: Tbilisi State Academy of Arts
- Years active: 2001–present
- Known for: Georgian fashion design
- Label: Aka Nanitashvili

Aka Nanitashvili (Georgian: აკა ნანიტაშვილი) is a Georgian fashion designer based in Tbilisi.

Aka was born in Tbilisi, Georgia in 1978. She graduated from Tbilisi State Academy of Arts in 2000.

She founded her first boutique "Capriccio" in 2001. Afterwards, she extended her business and launched "K Studio" in partnership with a couple of other designers in 2006. At present she runs her own fashion house.
