= Aboriginal Children's Advancement Society =

Organization in New South Wales

The Aboriginal Children's Advancement Society (ACAS) is an organisation in New South Wales, Australia that aims to achieve Aboriginal reconciliation by improving the education of Aboriginal children.

The organisation was founded in 1966 and funded by private and corporate donations. The belief is that with improved education the children will be better able to compete for mainstream employment. To achieve this it founded the Kirinari Aboriginal Students Hostels. Many Aboriginal secondary school students have been able to achieve tertiary qualifications through the experience gained at a Kirinari hostel.

Aboriginal children from country New South Wales attend Gymea Technological High School, Endeavour Sports High School and Minerva Special Needs High School in the Sutherland Shire. The other Kirinari caters for boys who attend Cardiff High School in the city of Newcastle. The founder of ACAS was Hazel Wilson; with six other ladies from Gymea Congregational Church and the Member for Hughes, Leslie Johnson, she formed the Aboriginal Children's Advancement Society at a public meeting held in the Miranda School of Arts, in February 1963. The principal aim of the Society, the building of a hostel to enable Aboriginal children to attend high school in the city, was accomplished within four years. The first stage of Kirinari Hostel was opened on National Aborigines Day, July 1967. Extensions followed over the years culminating in the opening of the Bert Groves Wing on 22 May 1971.
