= Aka, Iran =

Aka اكائ
- Village
- Location within Iran
- Coordinates: 31°50′55″N 50°09′03″E
- Country: Iran
- Province: Khuzestan
- County: Izeh
- Bakhsh: Dehdez
- Rural District: Donbaleh Rud-e Shomali

Population (2006)
  - Total: 24
- Time zone: UTC+3:30 (IRST)
  - Summer (DST): UTC+4:30 (IRDT)

Aka (Persian: اكائ, also Romanized as Akā’) is a village in Donbaleh Rud-e Shomali Rural District, Dehdez District, Izeh County, Khuzestan Province, Iran. At the 2006 census, its population was 24, in 5 families.
