= Niak =

Village in Mazandaran province, Iran

Niak Persian: نیاک
- Village
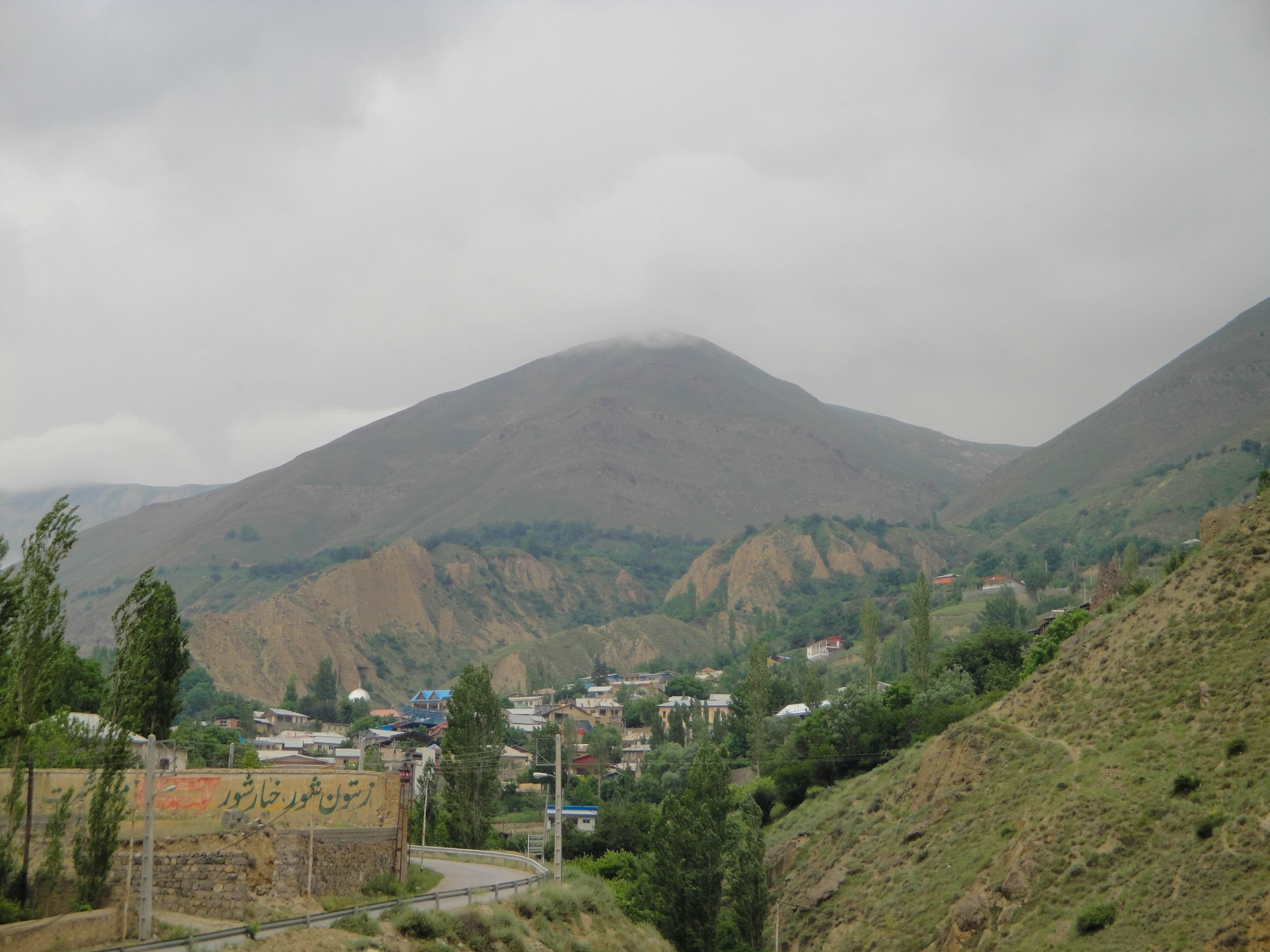
- The village of Niak

- Location within Iran
- Coordinates: 35°52′19″N 52°11′20″E
- Country: Iran
- Province: Mazandaran
- County: Amol
- District: Larijan
- Rural District: Bala Larijan

Population (2016)
  - Total: 166
- Time zone: UTC+3:30 (IRST)

Niak (Persian: نیاک) (Note: Also romanized as Neyāk, Nīāk, and Niyāk) is a village in Bala Larijan Rural District of Larijan District in Amol County, Mazandaran province, Iran.

== Demographics ==
=== Population ===
At the time of the 2006 National Census, the village's population was 210 in 61 households. The following census in 2011 counted 143 people in 51 households. The 2016 census measured the population of the village as 166 people in 61 households.
