= Jonathan Aka =

French basketball player (born 1986)

Free agent
- Position: Power forward
- League: LNB Pro B

Personal information
- Born: September 13, 1986 (age 40) Paris, France
- Listed height: 6 ft 8 in (2.03 m)
- Listed weight: 253 lb (115 kg)

Career information
- Playing career: 2004–present

Career history
- 2004–2006: Élan Béarnais Pau-Orthez
- 2006–2007: JDA Dijon
- 2008–2010: Boulazac Dordogne
- 2010–2012: JA Vichy
- 2012: Poitiers Basket 86
- 2012–2013: Paris-Levallois
- 2014–2015: Denain
- 2015–2016: AS Monaco

Career highlights
- Leaders Cup champion (2016)
Medals
Men's basketball
Representing France
European U-18 Championship
Bronze medal – third place	2004 Spain	U-18 Team

Jonathan Roger Aka (born September 13, 1986) is a French professional basketball player.
