= SS Stettin (1923) =

German cargo ship

History
- Name: Stettin (1923–30); Akka (1930–45); Empire Calder (1945–47); Israel Gotesman (1947); Isgo (1947–50); Erich (1950–60); Pantera (1960–70)
- Owner: Stettiner Dampfer Compagnie AG (1923–30); Nord Deutsche Lloyd (1930–35); Atlas Levant Linie (1935–40); Kriegsmarine (1940–45); Ministry of War Transport (1945); Ministry of Transport (1945–47); Near East Shipping Co Ltd (1947–50); Karl Gross (1950–60); Palomba & Salvatori (1960–70)
- Operator: Deutsche Levant Linie (1924–40); Kriegsmarine (1940–45); Whimster & Co Ltd (1945–47); Near East Shipping Co Ltd (1947–50); Karl Gross (1950–60); Palomba & Salvatori (1960–70)
- Port of registry: (Weimar Republic) Stettin (1923–31); (Weimar Republic) Bremen (1931–33); (Nazi Germany) Bremen (1933–40); (Nazi Germany) Bremen (1940–45); (United Kingdom) London (1945–50); (West Germany) Bremen (1950–60); Italy (1960–70)
- Builder: Stettiner Oderwerke AG
- Launched: 1923
- Completed: 1924
- In service: 1924
- Out of service: October 1970
- Identification: German Official Number 8535 (1942–45); United Kingdom Official Number 180787 (1945–50); Code Letters JGBK (1923–33); Code Letters DOCW (1933–42); Code Letters SFMN (1942–45); Code Letters GQXJ (1945–50); IMO Number 5270090 (–1970)
- Fate: Scrapped October 1970

General characteristics
- Tonnage: 2,646 GRT; 1,511 NRT
- Length: 328 ft 9 in (100.20 m)
- Beam: 46 ft 0 in (14.02 m)
- Depth: 18 ft 7 in (5.66 m)
- Installed power: Triple expansion steam engine
- Propulsion: Screw propeller
- Speed: 9.5 knots (17.6 km/h)

Stettin was a 2,646 GRT cargo ship which was built in 1923 for the Stettiner Dampfer Compagnie. In 1930 she was sold to Norddeutscher Lloyd and renamed Akka. She was requisitioned by the Kriegsmarine in 1940. Akka was seized as a war prize in 1945, passing to the Ministry of War Transport (MoWT) and being renamed Empire Calder.

She was sold in 1947 to the Near East Shipping Co and renamed Israel Gotesman and then Isgo. In 1950 she was sold to Karl Gross, Bremen and renamed Erich. In 1960, she was sold to Palomba & Salvatori, Italy and renamed Pantera, serving until she was scrapped in 1970.

== Description ==
The ship was built by Stettiner Oderwerke AG, Stettin for Stettiner Dampfer Compagnie AG.

She was launched in 1923, and completed in 1924.

The ship was 328 feet 9 inches (100.20 m) long, with a beam of 46 feet 0 inches (14.02 m) and a depth of 18 feet 7 inches (5.66 m). She had a GRT of 2,646 and a NRT of 1,511. She was propelled by a triple expansion steam engine which had cylinders of 22 3/8 inches (57 cm), 35 13/16 inches (91.0 cm) and 57 inches (140 cm) diameter by 39 3/8 (100 cm) stroke. The engine was built by Stettiner Oderwerke AG.

== History ==
Stettin was built for Stettiner Dampfer Compagnie AG, Stettin. She was operated under the management of Deutsche Levante Linie. Her code letters were JBGK and her port of registry was Stettin. In 1930, she was sold to Norddeutscher Lloyd and renamed Akka. Her port of registry was changed to Bremen and she remained under the management of Deutsche Levant Linie AG. In 1934, her Code Letters were changed to DOCW. In 1935, she was sold to Atlas Levant Linie AG. She was requisitioned by the Kriegsmarine in 1940. In 1942, Akka was allocated the German Official Number 8535 and her Code Letters were changed to SFMN. she was damaged by mine and beached off Varangerfjord, Norway, 29 November 1942. Later refloated, repaired, returned to service.

In 1945, Akka was seized as a war prize and passed to the MoWT. She was renamed Empire Calder and placed under the management of Whimster & Co Ltd. Her port of registry was changed to London. She was allocated the United Kingdom Official Number 180787 and the Code Letters GFDY. In 1947, she was sold to the Near East Shipping Co Ltd, London. She was renamed Israel Gotesman, which was later shortened to Isgo. In 1950, she was sold to Karl Gross, Bremen and renamed Erich. In 1960, she was sold to Palomba & Salvatori, Italy and renamed Pantera, serving until she was scrapped in Italy in October 1970. With the introduction of IMO numbers, Pantera was allocated the IMO Number 5270090.
