= Akka, Republic of Dagestan =

Akka Акка Акъа
- Selo
- Location within Republic of Dagestan Location within Russia
- Coordinates: 41°55′N 47°55′E
- Country: Russia
- Region: Republic of Dagestan
- District: Tabasaransky District
- Time zone: UTC+3:00

Akka (Russian: Акка; Tabassaran: Акъа) is a rural locality (a selo) in Khuchninsky Selsoviet, Tabasaransky District, Republic of Dagestan, Russia. Population: 600 (2010 census); 687 (2002 census); 443 (1989 Soviet census). There are 2 streets.

== Geography ==
Akka is located 13 km (8.1 mi) southwest of Khuchni (the district's administrative centre) by road. Tsurtil is the nearest rural locality.
