= Barbaros Akkaş =

Turkish basketball manager

Barbaros Akkaş (born November 26, 1976, in Istanbul) is the former Turkish Basketball Federation National Teams Director of Sport. Barbaros Akkaş, who is married to Dilara Akkaş, has been managing Turkish National Basketball Teams since 1997. He announced his resignation in October 2016.
