= Dinan, Mazandaran =

Dinan دينان
- Village
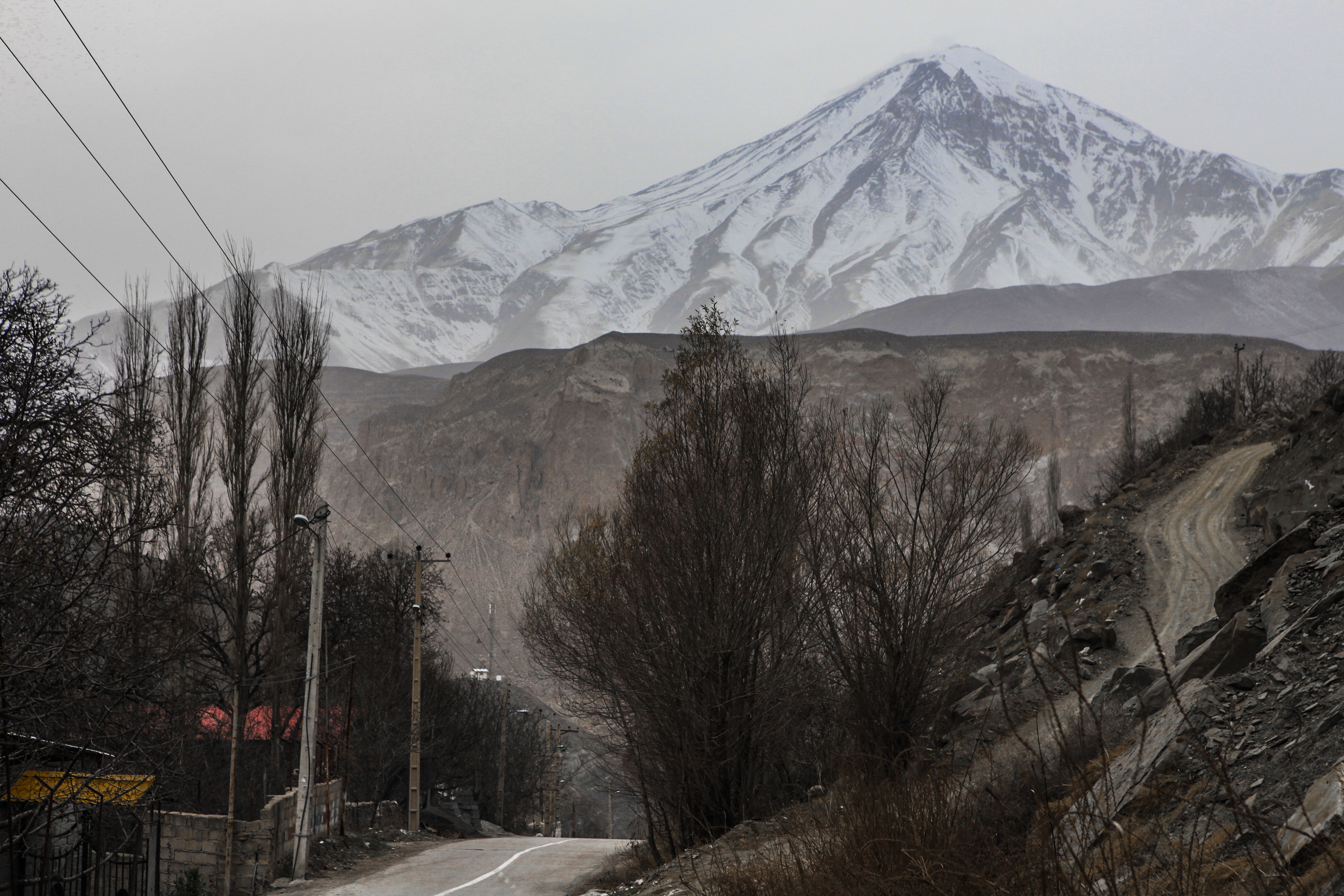
- Mount Damavand from Dinan

- Location within Iran
- Coordinates: 35°55′23″N 52°17′34″E
- Country: Iran
- Province: Mazandaran
- County: Amol
- Bakhsh: Larijan
- Rural District: Bala Larijan

Population (2016)
  - Total: 94
- Time zone: UTC+3:30 (IRST)

Dinan (Persian: دينان, also Romanized as Dīnān; also known as Dinan) is a village in Bala Larijan Rural District, Larijan District, Amol County, Mazandaran Province, Iran. As of its 2016 census, its population was 94 across 31 families.
