= Akkas (name) =

Akkas is a surname and given name. Notable people with the name include:

- Akkas Ali, Bangladeshi politician
- Akkas Ali Miah, Bangladeshi politician
- Azizur Rahman Akkas, Bangladeshi politician
- Mirza Ebrahim Khan Akkas Bashi (1874–1915), Persian photographer

== Other ==
- Akkas gas field

== See also ==
- Akkaş, a Turkish surname
- Akash (disambiguation)
