= AKA (car) =

Alfred Kunze, Továrna na stroje a osobní automobily
- Company type: Private limited company
- Industry: Automotive
- Founded: 1925
- Defunct: 1925
- Headquarters: Růžodol near Liberec, Czech Republic
- Products: Automobiles, Trucks

Alfred Kunze, Továrna na stroje a osobní automobily was a Czech manufacturer of automobiles.

== History ==
The company was founded in Růžodol near Liberec as a machine factory, repair shop and motor vehicle maker. In 1925, the production of automobiles began. The brand name was called AKA. Production ended in that same year.

== Vehicles ==
The company manufactured some passenger cars and trucks.

== Literature ==
- Harald H. Linz, Halwart Schrader: Die Internationale Automobil-Enzyklopädie. United Soft Media Verlag, Munich 2008, ISBN 978-3-8032-9876-8. (German)
- Marián Šuman-Hreblay: Encyklopedie automobilů. České a slovenské osobní automobily od roku 1815 do současnosti. Computer Press, Brünn 2007, ISBN 978-80-251-1587-9. (Czech)
