= Lasem =

Village in Mazandaran province, Iran

Lasem Persian: لاسم
- Village
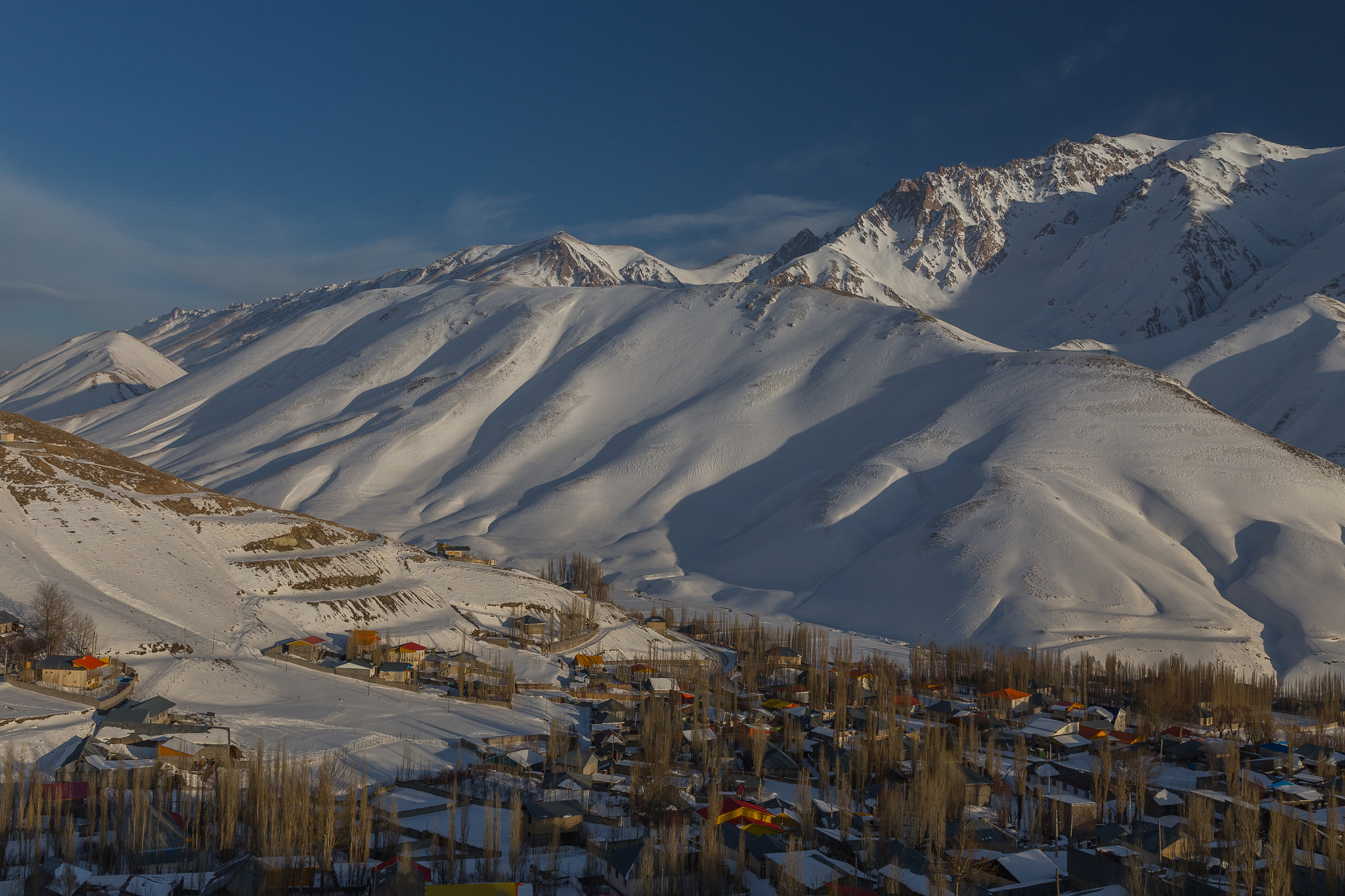
- The village of Laser in winter

- Location within Iran
- Coordinates: 35°48′35″N 52°12′31″E
- Country: Iran
- Province: Mazandaran
- County: Amol
- District: Larijan
- Rural District: Bala Larijan

Population (2016)
  - Total: 199
- Time zone: UTC+3:30 (IRST)

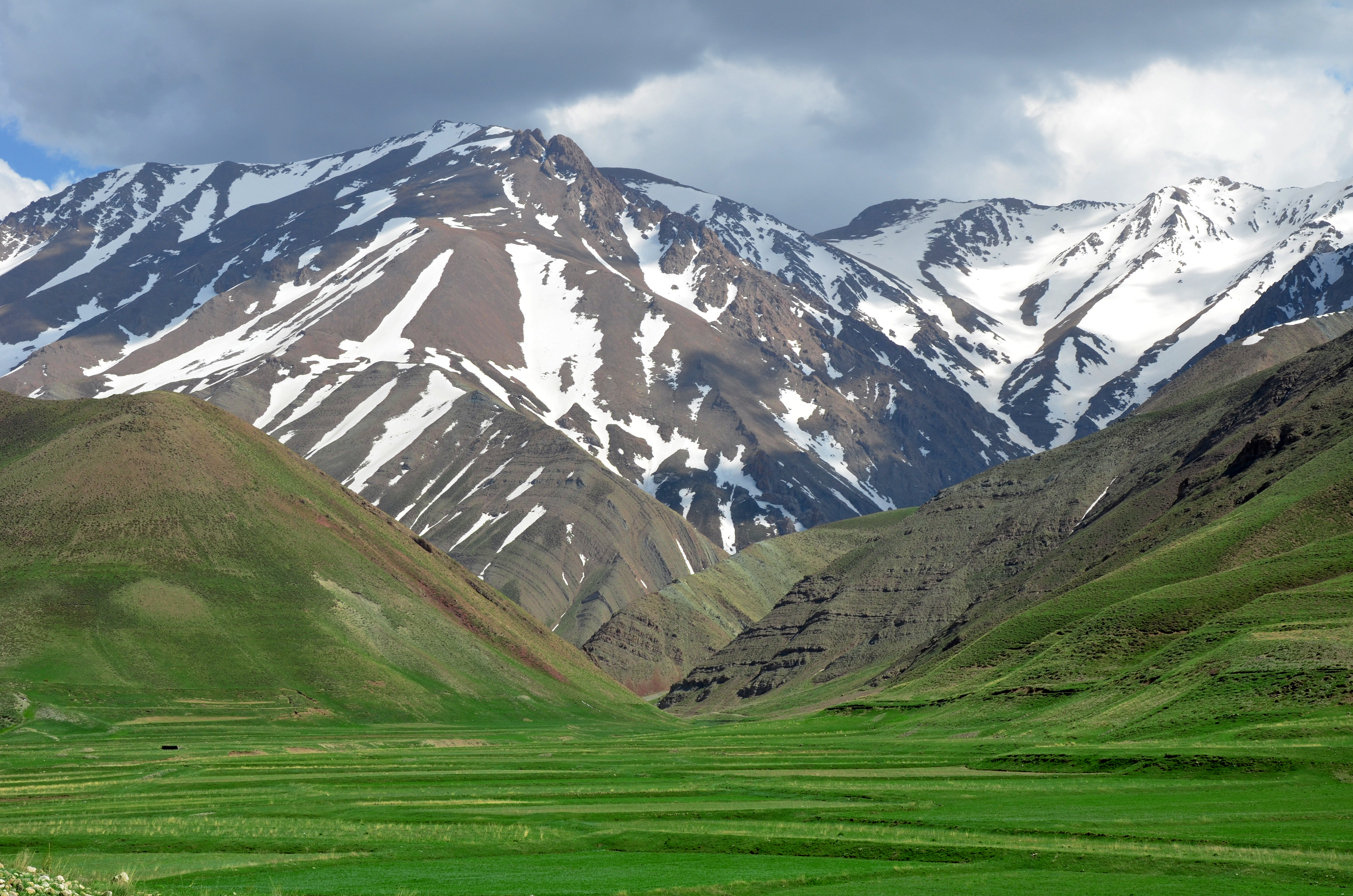
Lasem Road

Lasem (Persian: لاسم) (Note: Also romanized as Lāsem and Lasm; also known as Lishan) is a village in Bala Larijan Rural District of Larijan District in Amol County, Mazandaran province, Iran.

== Demographics ==
=== Population ===
At the time of the 2006 National Census, the village's population was 44 in 20 households. The following census in 2011 counted 63 people in 33 households. The 2016 census measured the population of the village as 199 people in 76 households.
