= Akha, Iran =

Village in Mazandaran province, Iran

Akha Persian: آخا
- Village
- Location within Iran
- Coordinates: 35°55′33″N 52°17′11″E
- Country: Iran
- Province: Mazandaran
- County: Amol
- District: Larijan
- Rural District: Bala Larijan

Population (2016)
  - Total: 173
- Time zone: UTC+3:30 (IRST)

Akha (Persian: اخا) (Note: Also romanized as Ākhā; also known as Ākhāzīr) is a village in Bala Larijan Rural District of Larijan District in Amol County, Mazandaran province, Iran.

== Demographics ==
=== Population ===
At the time of the 2006 National Census, the village's population was 155 in 43 households. The following census in 2011 counted 115 people in 41 households. The 2016 census measured the population of the village as 173 people in 60 households.
