= Saint Jean d'Acre =

Saint Jean d'Acre ('Saint John of Acre') or the Italian equivalent San Giovanni d'Acri (and Acone) may refer to:

- the city Acre, Israel, notably during the Crusader Latin Kingdom of Jerusalem (later shifting its capital to Acre)
- a former Latin Catholic Diocese of Acre with see there, later a titular see
