= 1957 Alborz earthquake =

Natural disaster in Iran

- Location within Iran
- UTC time: 1957-07-02 00:42:26
- ISC event: 886779
- USGS-ANSS: ComCat
- Local date: 2 July 1957
- Local time: 04:12:26
- Magnitude: M_{w} 7.1
- Depth: 15 km (9 mi)
- Epicenter: 36.277°N 52.778°E
- Type: Thrust
- Areas affected: Iran
- Max. intensity: MMI IX (Violent)
- Casualties: 1,500 killed

The 1957 Alborz earthquake struck northern Iran's Mazandaran province at 04:12 on 2 July. It had a moment magnitude (M_{w}) of 7.1 and occurred at a focal depth of 15 km (9.3 mi). The thrust-faulting shock was assigned a maximum Modified Mercalli intensity of IX (Violent). It devastated 120 villages in the Alborz Mountains and caused an estimated 1,500 fatalities. The earthquake also triggered landslides including one that dammed the Haraz River. Some damage was also reported in Tehran, Qaem Shahr and Sari.

== Tectonic setting ==
The Iranian plateau is a region of highly deformed crust wedged between the Arabian Plate to the southwest and Eurasian Plate to the northeast. Crustal deformation is dictated by oblique-convergence between the two tectonic plates. Deformation is accommodated by reverse and strike-slip faulting. Off the country's Makran coast, the seafloor undergoes active subduction. In northern and southern Iran, thrusting allows convergence through crustal thickening to take place. Most of the convergence is accommodated along fold and thrust belts of the Zagros, Alborz, Kopet Dag mountains, and in eastern Iran, where seismicity is high. Seismicity in the central plateau is low due to its geology consisting of rigid and aseismic tectonic blocks such as the Central Iran, Lut and Southern Caspian blocks.

== Earthquake ==
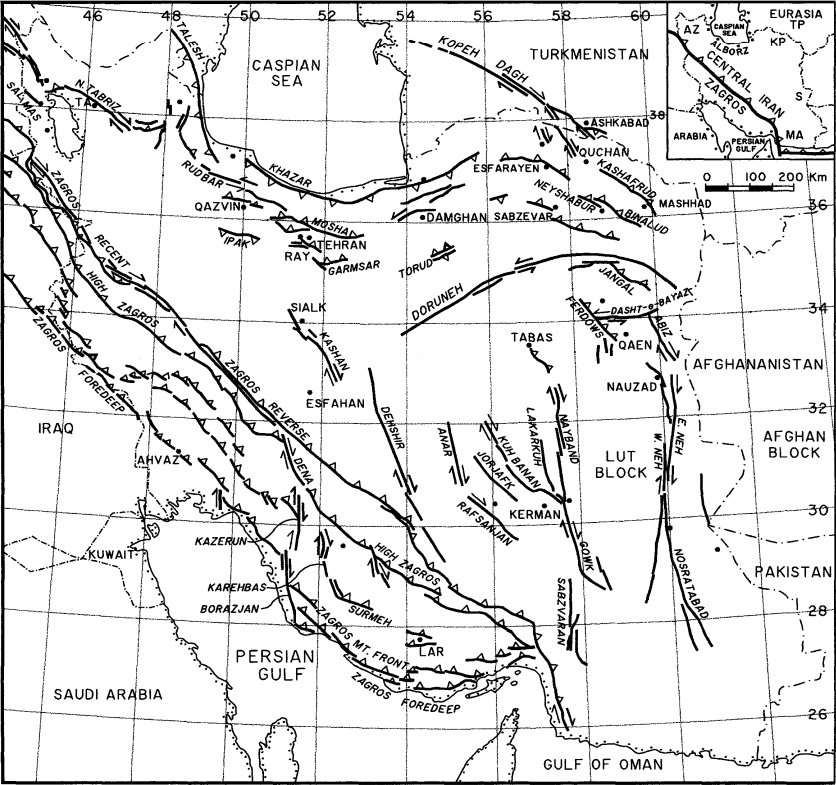
A map of major faults in Iran

The earthquake was the result of shallow thrust faulting along the Larzaneh Fault, a shallow south-dipping thrust fault in the central Alborz Mountains. The earthquake's rupture dimensions was an area of fault estimated at 50 km (31 mi) by 25 km (16 mi). It was the second largest instrumentally recorded earthquake in the Alborz, behind the 1990 Manjil–Rudbar earthquake (M_{w} 7.3). The earthquake's fault plane solution indicates it occurred along a northwest–southeast trending reverse fault. The corresponding Mercalli intensity isoseismal lines showed an east–west trend and greater damage to the south, implying the fault trended east–west before dipping south. The shock occurred near a section of the Larzaneh Fault that connects with another opposite-dipping reverse fault.

No evidence of surface rupture was found, partly because the area of maximum damage was inaccessible and rocklides cut off routes through the mountains. However, some fault movement was observed along the Amir Fault Zone, a south-dipping reverse fault. Fresh cracks were reported along a road that crosses the fault. Nicholas Ambraseys also documented 3 km (1.9 mi) of surface faulting that was not coseismic. These features were likely the result of landslides rather than tectonic movement. Several large fissures extending for several kilometers in the mountainous area north of Sangchal were fractures from a landslide.

== Impact ==
News coverage of the destruction and aftermath

The earthquake killed over 1,500 people and levelled 120 villages. Among the dead, over 200 were killed in Zirab; 60 in Pol-e Sefid; 63 in Dinan; 30 in Shangoldeh; 56 in Hajji Dela; 65 in Nandal; 84 in Pardameh; 30 in Polur; and 180 in Sang Chal. The meizoseismal area was located between the Haraz and Talar rivers; encompassing the dehestans of Band Pay, Beh, Dala Rustaq and Chalav. The villages of Sang Chal, Nandal, Chaliyasar, Nasal, Andvar and Pardameh were the hardest hit. In Burun, Varzaneh, Shangoldeh, Nal and Dinan, rockfalls and landslides contributed to further devastation. A 1 km (0.62 mi) long reservoir formed near Aliabad after a 10,000 m^{3} (350,000 cu ft) landslide obstructed and formed a 20 m (66 ft) high dam across the Haraz River.

Engineered infrastructure along the Haraz road received little damage. In Bayjan, the abutments of an 80 m (260 ft) long masonry arch bridge sunk, and its deck fractured. Cracks appeared inside a tunnel connecting Kuhrud and Bayjan. Minor damage was observed at a tunnel near Nur and on a wooden bridge in Aliabad. Damage was almost absent on the Caspian Sea plain with the exception of light impacts to tobacco facilities in Sari and Amol, and a water tower in Babol. Some modern constructions in Qaem Shahr were also affected. South of the Alborz Mountains, the villages of Shahrabad and Tares sustained damage.

Damage beyond the meizoseismal area was distributed over a wide area, though less severe. The degree of damage decreased sharply northwest and southeast of this area. Additional damage occurred in Pul-i Safid and Shirgah, and several homes were destroyed in the town of Utu situated along the Kaslian River. Caved-in roofs were reported in Polur and Fasham, and some homes in Tehran also sustained damage. An imamzadeh at Vāneh and the Emamzadeh Hashem Shrine were badly damaged.

== See also ==
- List of earthquakes in 1957
- List of earthquakes in Iran
