= Miandeh, Amol =

Miandeh میانده
- Village
- Location within Iran
- Coordinates: 36°01′23.1″N 52°11′22.17″E
- Country: Iran
- Province: Mazandaran
- County: Amol
- Bakhsh: Larijan
- Rural District: Larijan-e Sofla
- Elevation: 2,180 m (7,150 ft)

Population (2016)
  - Total: 43
- Time zone: UTC+3:30 (IRST)

Miandeh (Persian: میانده, also Romanized as Miāndeh, and Miyan Deh) is a mountainous village in Larijan-e Sofla Rural District, Larijan District, Amol County, Mazandaran Province, Iran, part of the historical Delarestaq rural district. It is 37 km (23 mi) north of Rineh city, between Hajji Dela and Nandal villages.

Population history: Miandeh, Amol
Year	Pop.	±%
1950	30	—
1966	20	−33.3%
1976	15	−25.0%
1986	11	−26.7%
2016	43	+290.9%

At the 2016 census, its population was 43, in 15 households. Wheat and Barley have been the main agricultural products of the village.
