= Keleri =

Neighborhood in Mazandaran province, Iran

Keleri Persian: کلری
- Neighborhood
- Location within Iran
- Country: Iran
- Province: Mazandaran
- County: Amol
- District: Larijan
- Rural District: Larijan-e Sofla
- Village: Keleri Kefa

Population (2016)
  - Total: 73
- Time zone: UTC+3:30 (IRST)

Keleri (Persian: کلری) (Note: Also romanized as Kelerī) is a neighborhood in the village of Keleri Kefa in Larijan-e Sofla Rural District of Larijan District in Amol County, Mazandaran province, Iran.

== Demographics ==
=== Population ===
At the time of the 2006 National Census, Keleri's population was 35 in 9 households, when it was a village in Larijan-e Sofla Rural District. The following census in 2011 counted 28 people in 13 households. The 2016 census measured the population of the village as 73 people in 27 households.

The villages of Keleri and Kefa were merged to form the village of Keleri Kefa in 2023.
