= Marijan, Larijan =

Marijan مريجان
- Village
- Location within Iran
- Coordinates: 36°03′33″N 52°19′33″E
- Country: Iran
- Province: Mazandaran
- County: Amol
- Bakhsh: Larijan
- Rural District: Larijan-e Sofla

Population (2006)
  - Total: 15
- Time zone: UTC+3:30 (IRST)

Marijan (Persian: مريجان, also Romanized as Marījān) is a village in Larijan-e Sofla Rural District, Larijan District, Amol County, Mazandaran Province, Iran. At the 2006 census, its population was 15, in 7 families. In 2016, the village had less than 4 households.
