= Razun, Mazandaran =

Razun رزون
- Village
- Location within Iran
- Coordinates: 36°02′00″N 52°14′22″E
- Country: Iran
- Province: Mazandaran
- County: Amol
- Bakhsh: Larijan
- Rural District: Larijan-e Sofla

Population (2016)
  - Total: 16
- Time zone: UTC+3:30 (IRST)

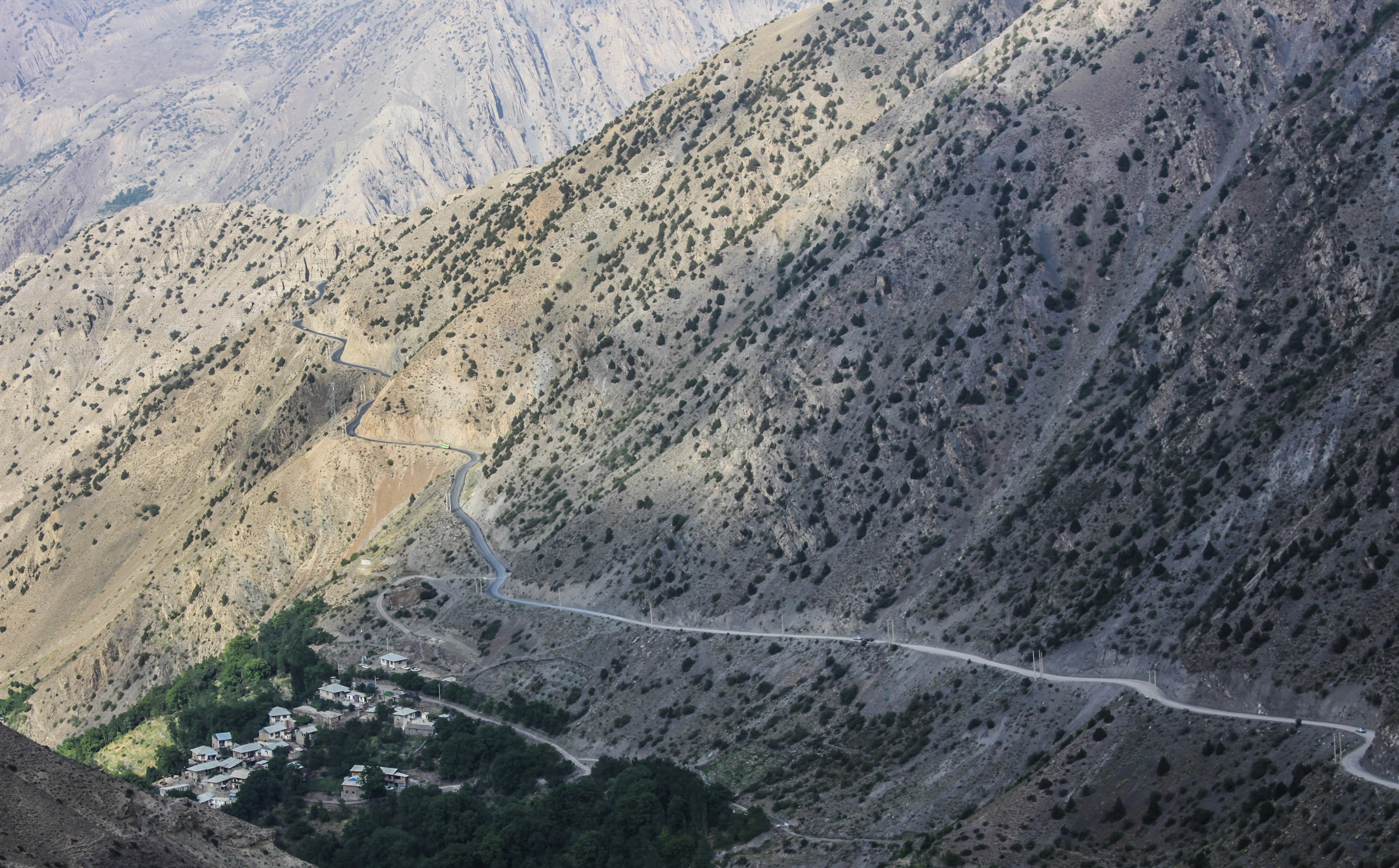

Razun (Persian: رزون, also Romanized as Razūn; also known as Razān) is a village in Larijan-e Sofla Rural District, Larijan District, Amol County, Mazandaran Province, Iran. At the 2016 census, its population was 16 in 8 families. Decreaed from 48 people in 2006
