= Divran =

Village in Mazandaran province, Iran

Divran Persian: ديوران
- Village
- Location within Iran
- Coordinates: 36°06′21″N 52°04′01″E
- Country: Iran
- Province: Mazandaran
- County: Amol
- District: Larijan
- Rural District: Larijan-e Sofla

Population (2016)
  - Total: 113
- Time zone: UTC+3:30 (IRST)

Divran (Persian: ديوران) (Note: Also romanized as Dīvrān) is a village in Larijan-e Sofla Rural District of Larijan District in Amol County, Mazandaran province, Iran.

== Demographics ==
=== Population ===
At the time of the 2006 National Census, the village's population was 98 in 25 households. The following census in 2011 counted 78 people in 27 households. The 2016 census measured the population of the village as 113 people in 44 households.
