= Nesel, Mazandaran =

Nesel نسل
- Village
- Location within Iran
- Coordinates: 36°05′37″N 52°09′08″E
- Country: Iran
- Province: Mazandaran
- County: Amol
- Bakhsh: Larijan
- Rural District: Larijan-e Sofla

Population (2016)
  - Total: 0
- Time zone: UTC+3:30 (IRST)

Nesel (Persian: نسل) is a village in Larijan-e Sofla Rural District, Larijan District, Amol County, Mazandaran Province, Iran. At the 2006 census, its population was 9, in 4 families. In 2016, there were no households residing in the village.
