= Kefa (disambiguation) =

Kefa may refer to:

- Kaffa Province, a former province of Ethiopia
- Keleri-Kefa, a small village in Iran
- Kefa, a word in Arabic and Aramaic that appears in the form Kefas in the Greek New Testament, and as Cephas in English translations
