= Kefa =

Neighborhood in Mazandaran province, Iran

Kefa Persian: کفا
- Neighborhood
- Location within Iran
- Country: Iran
- Province: Mazandaran
- County: Amol
- District: Larijan
- Rural District: Larijan-e Sofla
- Village: Keleri Kefa

Population (2016)
  - Total: 60
- Time zone: UTC+3:30 (IRST)

Keleri (Persian: كفا) (Note: Also romanized as Kefā) is a neighborhood in the village of Keleri Kefa in Larijan-e Sofla Rural District of Larijan District in Amol County, Mazandaran province, Iran.

== Demographics ==
=== Population ===
At the time of the 2006 National Census, Kefa's population was 38 in 10 households, when it was a village in Larijan-e Sofla Rural District. The following census in 2011 counted 47 people in 21 households. The 2016 census measured the population of the village as 60 people in 22 households.

The villages of Keleri and Kefa were merged to form the village of Keleri Kefa in 2023.
