= Bu ol Qalam =

Village in Mazandaran province, Iran

Bu ol Qalam Persian: بوالقلم
- Village
- Location within Iran
- Coordinates: 35°58′42″N 52°18′05″E
- Country: Iran
- Province: Mazandaran
- County: Amol
- District: Larijan
- Rural District: Larijan-e Sofla

Population (2016)
  - Total: 247
- Time zone: UTC+3:30 (IRST)

Bu ol Qalam (Persian: بوالقلم) (Note: Also romanized as Bū ol Qalam; also known as Bolqalam) is a village in Larijan-e Sofla Rural District of Larijan District in Amol County, Mazandaran province, Iran.

== Demographics ==
=== Population ===
At the time of the 2006 National Census, the village's population was 149 in 44 households. The following census in 2011 counted 138 people in 43 households. The 2016 census measured the population of the village as 247 people in 74 households.
