= Ahan Sar =

Village in Mazandaran province, Iran

Ahan Sar Persian: اهن سر
- Village
- Location within Iran
- Coordinates: 36°04′27″N 52°19′19″E
- Country: Iran
- Province: Mazandaran
- County: Amol
- District: Larijan
- Rural District: Larijan-e Sofla

Population (2016)
  - Total: 154
- Time zone: UTC+3:30 (IRST)

Ahan Sar (Persian: اهن سر) (Note: Also romanized as Āhan Sar; also known as Āfensar and Ākhen Sar) is a village in Larijan-e Sofla Rural District of Larijan District in Amol County, Mazandaran province, Iran.

== Demographics ==
=== Population ===
At the time of the 2006 National Census, the village's population was 80 in 27 households. The following census in 2011 counted 165 people in 56 households. The 2016 census measured the population of the village as 154 people in 55 households.
