= Panjab, Iran =

Village in Mazandaran province, Iran

Panjab Persian: پنجاب
- Village
- Location within Iran
- Coordinates: 36°05′56″N 52°15′15″E
- Country: Iran
- Province: Mazandaran
- County: Amol
- District: Larijan
- Rural District: Larijan-e Sofla

Population (2016)
  - Total: 231
- Time zone: UTC+3:30 (IRST)

Panjab (Persian: پنجاب) (Note: Also romanized as Panjāb) is a village in Larijan-e Sofla Rural District of Larijan District in Amol County, Mazandaran province, Iran.

== Demographics ==
=== Population ===
At the time of the 2006 National Census, the village's population was 205 in 64 households. The following census in 2011 counted 233 people in 52 households. The 2016 census measured the population of the village as 231 people in 83 households.
