= Amreh, Amol =

Amreh امره
- Village
- Location within Iran
- Coordinates: 36°06′03″N 52°08′57″E
- Country: Iran
- Province: Mazandaran
- County: Amol
- Bakhsh: Larijan
- Rural District: Larijan-e Sofla

Population (2016)
  - Total: 45
- Time zone: UTC+3:30 (IRST)

Amreh (Persian: امره) is a village in Larijan-e Sofla Rural District, Larijan District, Amol County, Mazandaran Province, Iran. At the 2016 census, its population was 45, in 18 families. Increased from 25 people in 2006.
