= Laher =

Laher لهر
- Village
- Location within Iran
- Coordinates: 36°03′55″N 52°12′20″E
- Country: Iran
- Province: Mazandaran
- County: Amol
- Bakhsh: Larijan
- Rural District: Larijan-e Sofla

Population (2016)
  - Total: 83
- Time zone: UTC+3:30 (IRST)

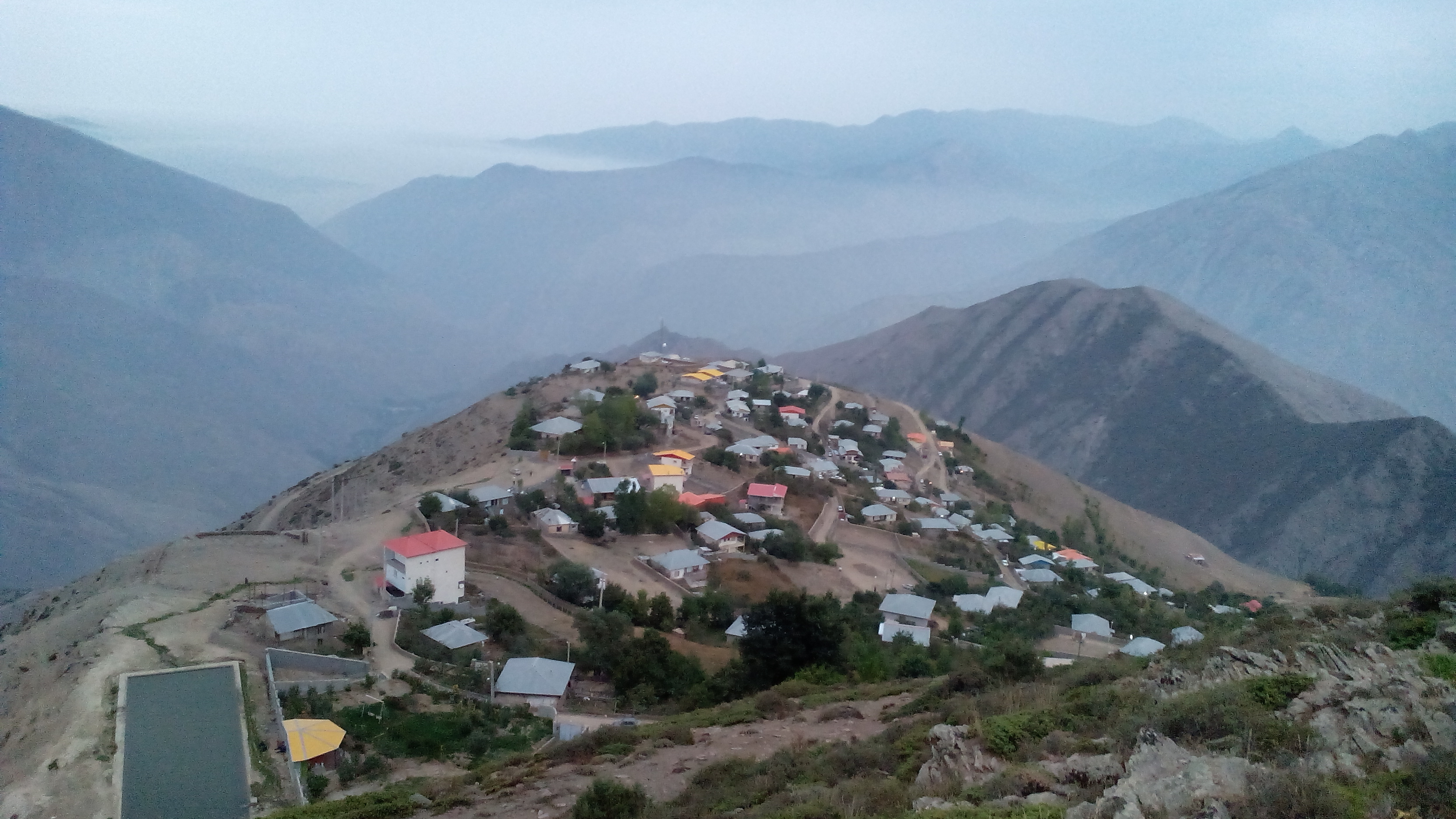
Leher and nearby mountains

Laher (Persian: لهر) is a village in Larijan-e Sofla Rural District, Larijan District, Amol County, Mazandaran Province, Iran. At the 2016 census, its population was 83, in 30 families. Increased from 37 people in 2006.
