= Korf, Amol =

Korf كرف
- Village
- Location within Iran
- Coordinates: 35°59′13″N 52°13′33″E
- Country: Iran
- Province: Mazandaran
- County: Amol
- Bakhsh: Larijan
- Rural District: Larijan-e Sofla

Population (2016)
  - Total: 56
- Time zone: UTC+3:30 (IRST)

- For other places with the name see- Korf.

Korf (Persian: كرف) is a village in Larijan-e Sofla Rural District, Larijan District, Amol County, Mazandaran Province, Iran. At the 2016 census, its population was 56, in 17 families. Increased from 25 people in 2006.
