= Tineh =

Tineh تينه
- Village
- Location within Iran
- Coordinates: 35°57′42″N 52°13′35″E
- Country: Iran
- Province: Mazandaran
- County: Amol
- Bakhsh: Larijan
- Rural District: Larijan-e Sofla

Population (2016)
  - Total: 31
- Time zone: UTC+3:30 (IRST)

Tineh (Persian: تينه, also Romanized as Tīneh; also known as Tine and Tinīeh) is a village in Larijan-e Sofla Rural District, Larijan District, Amol County, Mazandaran Province, Iran. At the 2006 census, its population was 31, in 11 families. Up from 27 in 2006.
