= Sova, Iran =

Sova سوا
- Village
- Location within Iran
- Coordinates: 36°06′04″N 52°10′18″E
- Country: Iran
- Province: Mazandaran
- County: Amol
- Bakhsh: Larijan
- Rural District: Larijan-e Sofla

Population (2016)
  - Total: 94
- Time zone: UTC+3:30 (IRST)

Sova (Persian: سوا, also romanized as Sovā and Sūā; also known as Suah) is a village in Larijan-e Sofla Rural District, Larijan District, Amol County, Mazandaran Province, Iran. At the 2016 census, its population was 94, in 42 families. Up from 89 in 2006.
