= Darreh Kenar =

Darreh Kenar دره كنار
- Village
- Location within Iran
- Coordinates: 36°05′10″N 52°09′16″E
- Country: Iran
- Province: Mazandaran
- County: Amol
- Bakhsh: Larijan
- Rural District: Larijan-e Sofla

Population (2016)
  - Total: 13
- Time zone: UTC+3:30 (IRST)

Darreh Kenar (Persian: دره كنار, also Romanized as Darreh Kenār; also known as Dar Kenār) is a village in Larijan-e Sofla Rural District, Larijan District, Amol County, Mazandaran Province, Iran. At the 2016 census, its population was 13, in 5 families. Down from 21 people in 2006.
