= Keleri Kefa =

Village in Mazandaran province, Iran

Keleri Kefa Persian: کلری کفا
- Village
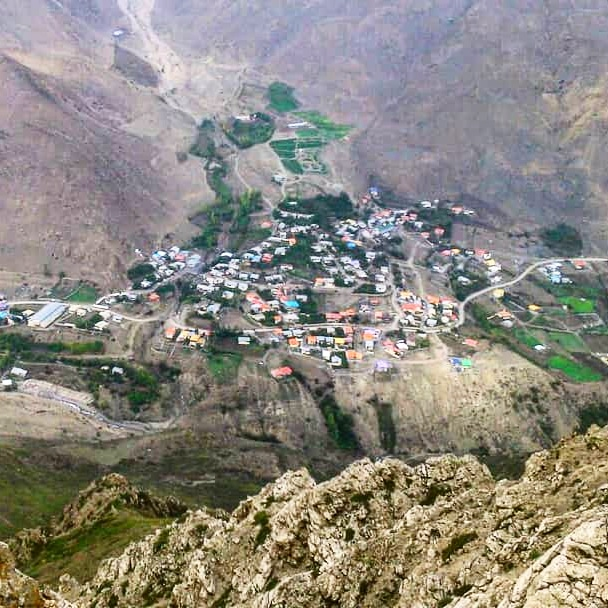
- The village of Keleri Kefa

- Location within Iran
- Coordinates: 36°06′10″N 52°05′43″E
- Country: Iran
- Province: Mazandaran
- County: Amol
- District: Larijan
- Rural District: Larijan-e Sofla
- Time zone: UTC+3:30 (IRST)

Keleri Kefa (Persian: کلری کفا) is a village in Larijan-e Sofla Rural District of Larijan District, Amol County, Mazandaran province, Iran.

== History ==
The villages of Keleri and Kefa were merged to form the village of Keleri Kefa in 2023.
