= Peleriyeh =

Village in Mazandaran province, Iran

Peleriyeh Persian: پلريه
- Village
- Location within Iran
- Coordinates: 36°06′28″N 52°07′00″E
- Country: Iran
- Province: Mazandaran
- County: Amol
- District: Larijan
- Rural District: Larijan-e Sofla

Population (2016)
  - Total: 110
- Time zone: UTC+3:30 (IRST)

Peleriyeh (Persian: پلريه) (Note: Also romanized as Pelerīyeh) is a village in Larijan-e Sofla Rural District of Larijan District in Amol County, Mazandaran province, Iran.

== Demographics ==
=== Population ===
At the time of the 2006 National Census, the village's population was 51 in 21 households. The following census in 2011 counted 78 people in 33 households. The 2016 census measured the population of the village as 110 people in 37 households.
