= Abd ol Manaf =

Village in Mazandaran province, Iran

Abd ol Manaf Persian: عبدالمناف
- Village
- Location within Iran
- Coordinates: 36°05′03″N 52°08′36″E
- Country: Iran
- Province: Mazandaran
- County: Amol
- District: Larijan
- Rural District: Larijan-e Sofla

Population (2016)
  - Total: 111
- Time zone: UTC+3:30 (IRST)

Abd ol Manaf (Persian: عبدالمناف) (Note: Also romanized as ‘Abd ol Manāf) is a village in Larijan-e Sofla Rural District of Larijan District in Amol County, Mazandaran province, Iran.

== Demographics ==
=== Population ===
At the time of the 2006 National Census, the village's population was 52 in 16 households. The following census in 2011 counted 59 people in 21 households. The 2016 census measured the population of the village as 111 people in 38 households.
