= Lut, Iran =

Lut لوط
- Village
- Location within Iran
- Coordinates: 35°58′04″N 52°18′29″E
- Country: Iran
- Province: Mazandaran
- County: Amol
- Bakhsh: Larijan
- Rural District: Larijan-e Sofla

Population (2016)
  - Total: 90
- Time zone: UTC+3:30 (IRST)

Lut (Persian: لوط, also Romanized as Lūţ; also known as Lūţ-e Bahrestāq) is a village in Larijan-e Sofla Rural District, Larijan District, Amol County, Mazandaran Province, Iran. At the 2016 census, its population was 90, in 34 families.
