= Haft Tan =

Haft Tan (Persian: هفت تن) may refer to:

- Haft Tan, Amol, Mazandaran Province
- Haft Tan, Qaem Shahr, Mazandaran Province
