= Korff =

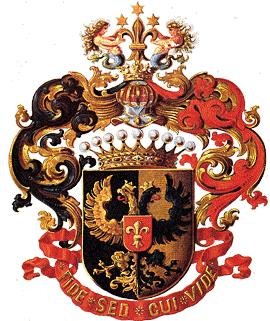
Coat of Arms of the Russian line of the Counts von Korff, 1872

The Korff family or Korff-Schmising family is an ancient German noble family, known since the first half of the 13th century that originated in the County of Mark, Westphalia.

== History ==
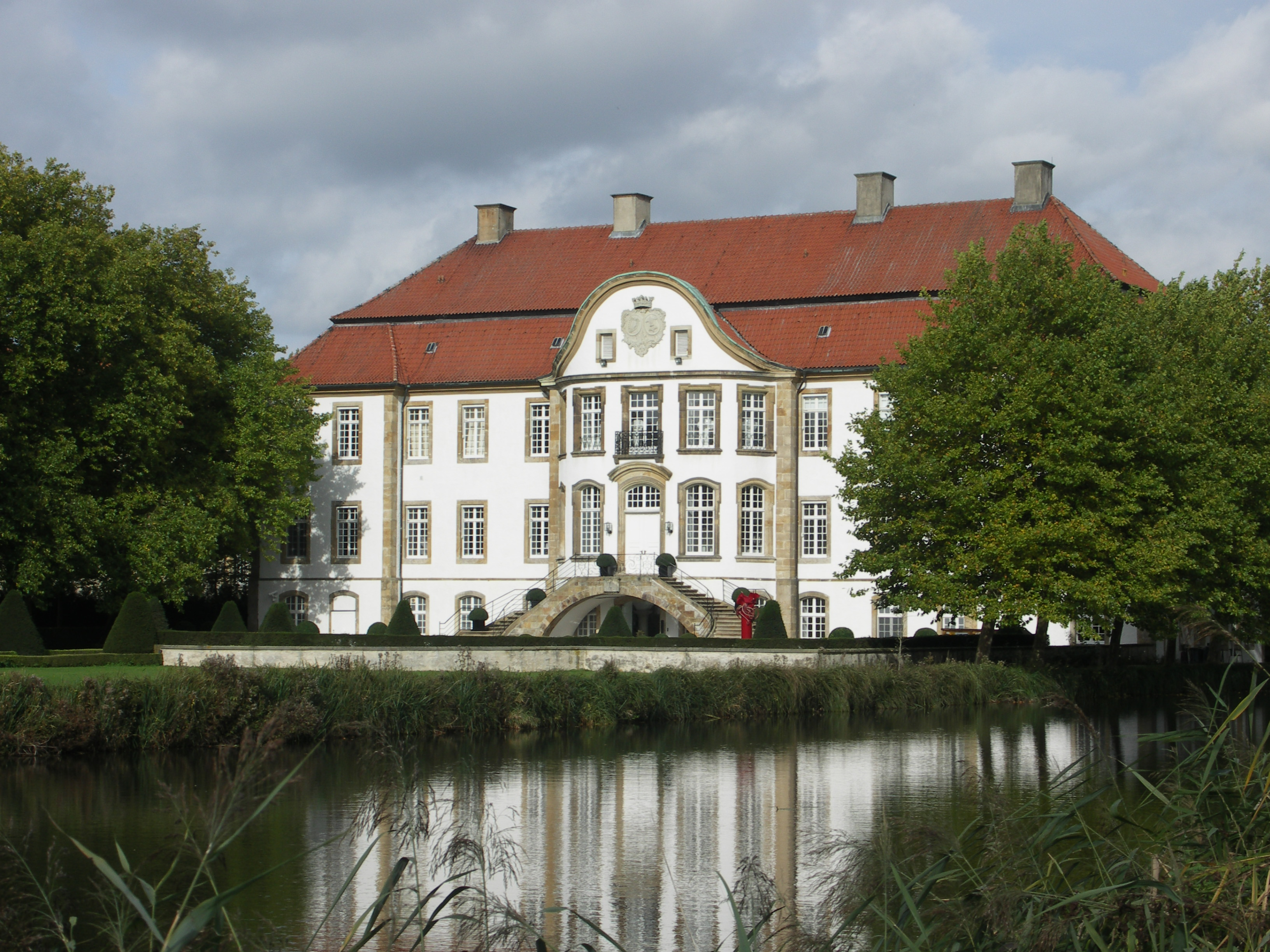
Korff family ancestral seat: Harkotten Castle in Sassenberg

The family first appears in a document from 1241 with knight Henricus von Kersekorff. Since 1354, part of the family has been called Korff-Schmising (also Schmysing or Schmysingk). Members of the family distinguished themselves mostly as politicians and diplomats. They held the title of Count in the Kingdom of Prussia granted to them on 17 January 1816 by Frederick William III of Prussia and Count in the Russian Empire, granted to them on 1 January 1872 by Alexander II of Russia.

Apart from being incorporated into the Russian nobility, the family was also part of the Baltic German nobility and Polish nobility. Until 1615, the original ancestral seat of the Korff family was Harkotten Castle in Münster, later acquired by the Ketteler family.

== Surname ==
Korff is also a surname.

== Notable people ==
- Arnold Korff (1870–1944), Hollywood actor and director
- André Korff (born 1973), German bicycle racer
- Baruch Korff, (1914–1995), Jewish community activist
- Hans-Peter Korff (1942–2025), German actor
- Johann Albrecht von Korff (1697–1766), diplomat, president of the St. Petersburg Academy of Sciences
- Michael Von Korff (born 1949), American epidemiologist
- Serge Alexander Korff was an assistant of Governor-General of Finland
- Serge Alexander Korff (1906-1989), American physicist
- Werner Korff (1911–1999), German Olympic ice hockey player
- Yitzhak Aharon Korff, grand rabbi, diplomat and consultant in international law and business, entrepreneur

== See also ==
- Korf (disambiguation)
