= Nowsar =

Village in Mazandaran province, Iran

Nowsar Persian: نوسر
- Village
- Location within Iran
- Coordinates: 35°59′43″N 52°19′34″E
- Country: Iran
- Province: Mazandaran
- County: Amol
- District: Larijan
- Rural District: Larijan-e Sofla

Population (2016)
  - Total: 399
- Time zone: UTC+3:30 (IRST)

Nowsar (Persian: نوسر) is a village in Larijan-e Sofla Rural District of Larijan District in Amol County, Mazandaran province, Iran.

== Demographics ==
=== Population ===
At the time of the 2006 National Census, the village's population was 471 in 139 households. The following census in 2011 counted 399 people in 148 households. The 2016 census measured the population of the village as 399 people in 142 households.
