= Sheykh Mahalleh, Amol =

Village in Mazandaran province, Iran

Sheykh Mahalleh Persian: شيخ محله
- Village
- Location within Iran
- Coordinates: 36°06′32″N 52°07′42″E
- Country: Iran
- Province: Mazandaran
- County: Amol
- District: Larijan
- Rural District: Larijan-e Sofla

Population (2016)
  - Total: 114
- Time zone: UTC+3:30 (IRST)

Sheykh Mahalleh (Persian: شيخ محله) (Note: Also romanized as Sheykh Maḩalleh) is a village in Larijan-e Sofla Rural District of Larijan District in Amol County, Mazandaran province, Iran.

== Demographics ==
=== Population ===
At the time of the 2006 National Census, the village's population was 82 in 27 households. The following census in 2011 counted 106 people in 37 households. The 2016 census measured the population of the village as 114 people in 36 households.
