= Pardameh =

Pardameh پردمه
- Village
- Location within Iran
- Coordinates: 36°00′00″N 52°22′24″E
- Country: Iran
- Province: Mazandaran
- County: Amol
- Bakhsh: Larijan
- Rural District: Larijan-e Sofla

Population (2006)
  - Total: 9
- Time zone: UTC+3:30 (IRST)

Pardameh (Persian: پردمه) is a village in Larijan-e Sofla Rural District, Larijan District, Amol County, Mazandaran province, Iran. At the 2006 census, its population was nine, in four families. In 2016, it had less than four households.

Iranian Grand Ayatollah Mirza Hashem Amoli is from here.
