= Haft Tanan =

Village in Mazandaran province, Iran

Haft Tanan Persian: هفت تنان
- Village
- Location within Iran
- Coordinates: 35°58′38″N 52°18′40″E
- Country: Iran
- Province: Mazandaran
- County: Amol
- District: Larijan
- Rural District: Larijan-e Sofla

Population (2016)
  - Total: 203
- Time zone: UTC+3:30 (IRST)

Haft Tanan (Persian: هفت تنان) (Note: Also romanized as Haft Tanān; also known as Haft Tan) is a village in Larijan-e Sofla Rural District of Larijan District in Amol County, Mazandaran province, Iran.

== Demographics ==
=== Population ===
At the time of the 2006 National Census, the village's population was 159 in 45 households. The following census in 2011 counted 182 people in 65 households. The 2016 census measured the population of the village as 203 people in 71 households.
