= Bayjan, Mazandaran =

Village in Mazandaran province, Iran

Bayjan Persian: ناندل
- Village
- Location within Iran
- Coordinates: 35°59′06″N 52°16′54″E
- Country: Iran
- Province: Mazandaran
- County: Amol
- District: Larijan
- Rural District: Larijan-e Sofla

Population (2016)
  - Total: 415
- Time zone: UTC+3:30 (IRST)

Bayjan (Persian: بائيجان) (Note: Also romanized as Bā’yjān, Bāyjān, and Bāījān) is a village in, and the capital of, Larijan-e Sofla Rural District in Larijan District of Amol County, Mazandaran province, Iran.

== Demographics ==
=== Population ===
At the time of the 2006 National Census, the village's population was 344 in 97 households. The following census in 2011 counted 348 people in 96 households. The 2016 census measured the population of the village as 415 people in 138 households.
