= Karaf =

Karaf may refer to:

- Karaf, Tonekabon, a village in Mazandaran Province, Iran
- Apache Karaf, an OSGi distribution offered by the Apache Software Foundation based on Apache Felix

== See also ==
- Karafs, a village in Hamadan Province, Iran
- Korf (disambiguation)
