= Kahrud =

Village in Mazandaran province, Iran

Kahrud Persian: كهرود
- Village
- Location within Iran
- Coordinates: 36°03′22″N 52°14′54″E
- Country: Iran
- Province: Mazandaran
- County: Amol
- District: Larijan
- Rural District: Larijan-e Sofla

Population (2016)
  - Total: 133
- Time zone: UTC+3:30 (IRST)

Kahrud (Persian: كهرود) (Note: Also romanized as Kahrūd and Kohrūd; also known as Kahrūd-e Bālā) is a village in Larijan-e Sofla Rural District of Larijan District in Amol County, Mazandaran province, Iran.

== Demographics ==
=== Population ===
At the time of the 2006 National Census, the village's population was 121 in 42 households. The following census in 2011 counted 72 people in 29 households. The 2016 census measured the population of the village as 133 people in 44 households.
