= Korf =

Korf may refer to:

== Places ==
- Korf, Amol, a village in Mazandaran Province, Iran
- Korf, North Khorasan, a village in North Khorasan Province, Iran
- Korf, Russia, a rural locality (a selo) in Kamchatka Krai, Russia
- KORF, the ICAO airport code for Norfolk International Airport, Virginia, United States

== People ==
- Andrey Korf (1831–1893), Russian general
- Anthony Korf (b. 1951), American composer
- Bruce R. Korf, American medical geneticist
- Fyodor Korf (1773–1823), Russian military officer
- Mia Korf (b. 1965), American actress
- Richard P. Korf (1925–2016), American mycologist
- Tjeerd Korf (b. 1983), Dutch association football player

== Other uses ==
- Korfball, a ball sport, similar to netball and basketball

== See also ==
- Korfa Bay, Kamchatka Peninsula coast of the Bering Sea in Russia
- Korff (disambiguation)
- Karaf (disambiguation)
