= Gazanak =

City in Mazandaran province, Iran

Gazanak Persian: گزنک
- City
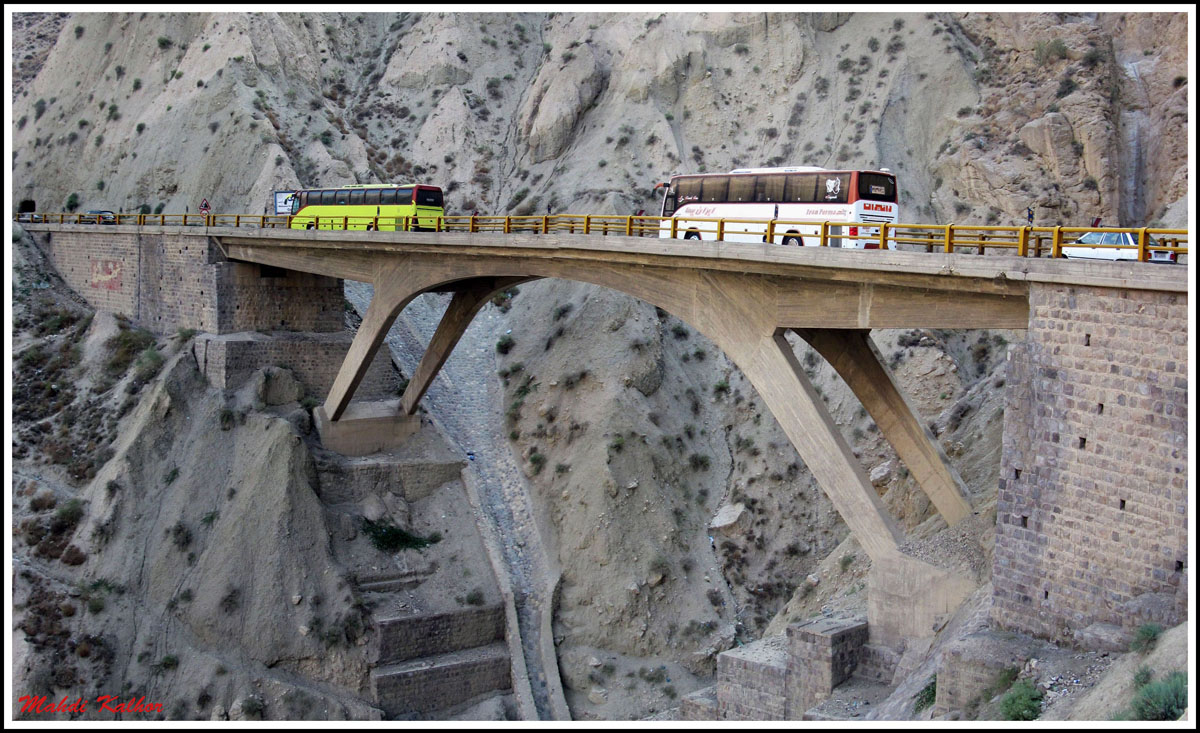
- 21st bridge of Haraz Road, Gazanak

- Location within Iran
- Coordinates: 35°54′13″N 52°13′32″E
- Country: Iran
- Province: Mazandaran
- County: Amol
- District: Larijan

Population (2016)
  - Total: 319
- Time zone: UTC+3:30 (IRST)

Gazanak (Persian: گزنک) is a city in, and the capital of, Larijan District in Amol County, Mazandaran province, Iran. It also serves as the administrative center for Bala Larijan Rural District.

== Demographics ==
=== Population ===
At the time of the 2006 National Census, the city's population was 323 in 94 households. The following census in 2011 counted 200 people in 66 households. The 2016 census measured the population of the city as 319 people in 103 households.
