= Nandal, Iran =

Village in Mazandaran province, Iran

Nandal Persian: ناندل
- Village
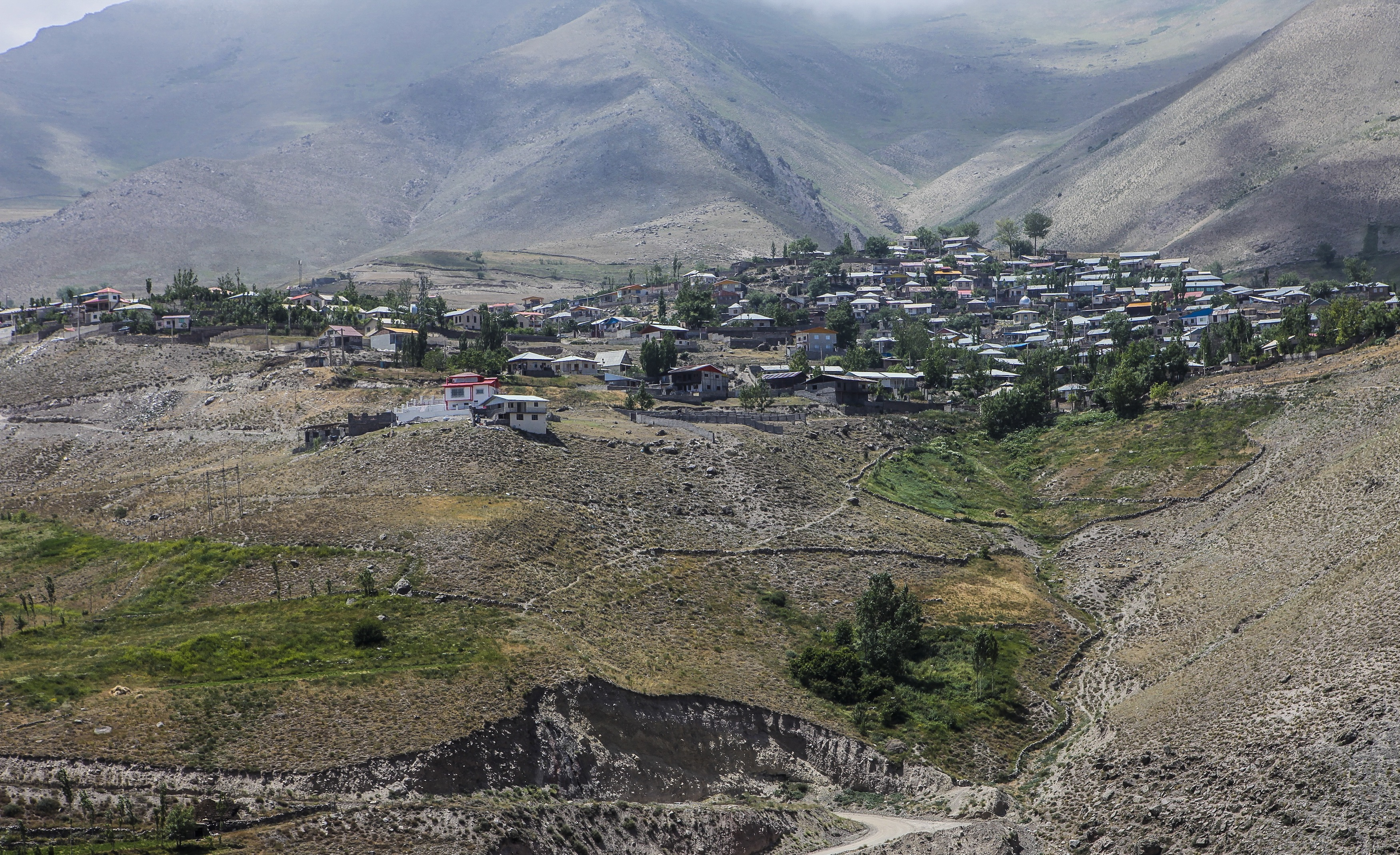
- The village of Nandal

- Location within Iran
- Coordinates: 36°01′48″N 52°10′27″E
- Country: Iran
- Province: Mazandaran
- County: Amol
- District: Larijan
- Rural District: Larijan-e Sofla
- Elevation: 2,300 m (7,500 ft)

Population (2016)
  - Total: 429
- Time zone: UTC+3:30 (IRST)

Nandal (Persian: ناندل) (Note: Also romanized as Nāndal and Nandel; also known as Nunāl) is a village in Larijan-e Sofla Rural District of Larijan District in Amol County, Mazandaran province, Iran.

== Demographics ==
=== Population ===
At the time of the 2006 National Census, the village's population was 315 in 90 households. The following census in 2011 counted 282 people in 113 households. The 2016 census measured the population of the village as 429 people in 162 households. It was the most populous village in its rural district.
