= Hajji Dela =

Hajji Dela حاجي دلا
- Village
- Location within Iran
- Coordinates: 36°01′06″N 52°11′39″E
- Country: Iran
- Province: Mazandaran
- County: Amol
- Bakhsh: Larijan
- Rural District: Larijan-e Sofla

Population (2016)
  - Total: 72
- Time zone: UTC+3:30 (IRST)

Hajji Dela (Persian: حاجي دلا, also Romanized as Ḩājjī Delā and Ḩajī Delā; also known as Haji Delak) is a village in Larijan-e Sofla Rural District, Larijan District, Amol County, Mazandaran Province, Iran. At the 2016 census, its population was 72, in 24 families. Increased from 27 people in 2006.
