= Emamzadeh Hashem Shrine =

Shi'ite funerary complex in Damavand, Mazandaran, Iran

- امامزاده هاشم
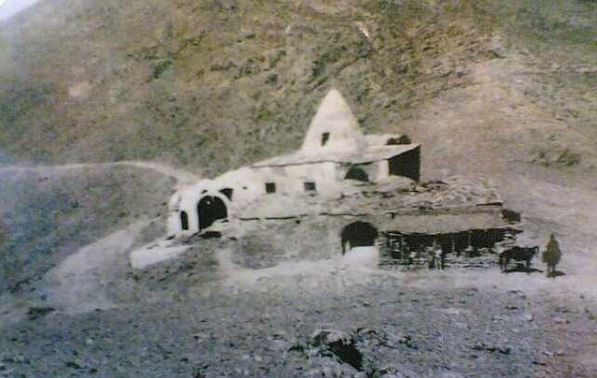
- Old photo of the Emamzadeh

- Location of the complex in Iran

Religion
- Affiliation: Shia Islam
- Ecclesiastical or organisational status: Imamzadeh
- Status: Active

Location
- Location: Larijan, Amol county, Mazandaran province
- Country: Iran
- Interactive map of Emamzadeh Hashem Shrine
- Coordinates: 35°46′44″N 52°02′18″E

Architecture
- Type: Islamic architecture
- Style: Safavid; Pahlavi
- Completed: 1089 AH (1678/1679 CE)

Specifications
- Dome: Two
- Minaret: Two
- Shrine: One
- Materials: Stone; plaster; lime; mortar; gold leaf; mirrors; ceramic tiles
- Elevation: 2,750 m (9,022 ft)
Emamzadeh Hashem Shrine

The Emamzadeh Hashem Shrine (Persian: امامزاده هاشم; Arabic: مرقد هاشم), also known as the Imamzade Hashem and the Imamzadeh Hashem (Haraz Road) (Persian: امامزاده هاشم (جاده هراز)), is a Shia imamzadeh and shrine complex, located in the district of Larijan, in Amol County, in the province of Mazandaran (adjacent to the boundary with the Tehran Province), in Iran. It is the burial place of Hashem, a descendant of the second Shia Imam Imam Hasan.

== Overview ==
The shrine is located in the northwest of Haraz Road, on the way from Tehran to Amol, almost at the summit of a mountain called Imam Zadeh Hashem Pass; at an elevation of 2,750 metres (9,020 ft) AMSL.

According to history, Imamzadeh Hashem is a descendant of Imam Hassan Mojtaba. According to the evidence, there used to be a caravanserai next to this tomb, which has been destroyed in recent years. Maxime Siroux wrote about that caravanserai in his book, Caravanserails d'Iran.

The complex was added to the Iran National Heritage List on 14 March 1967, administered by the Cultural Heritage, Handicrafts and Tourism Organization of Iran.

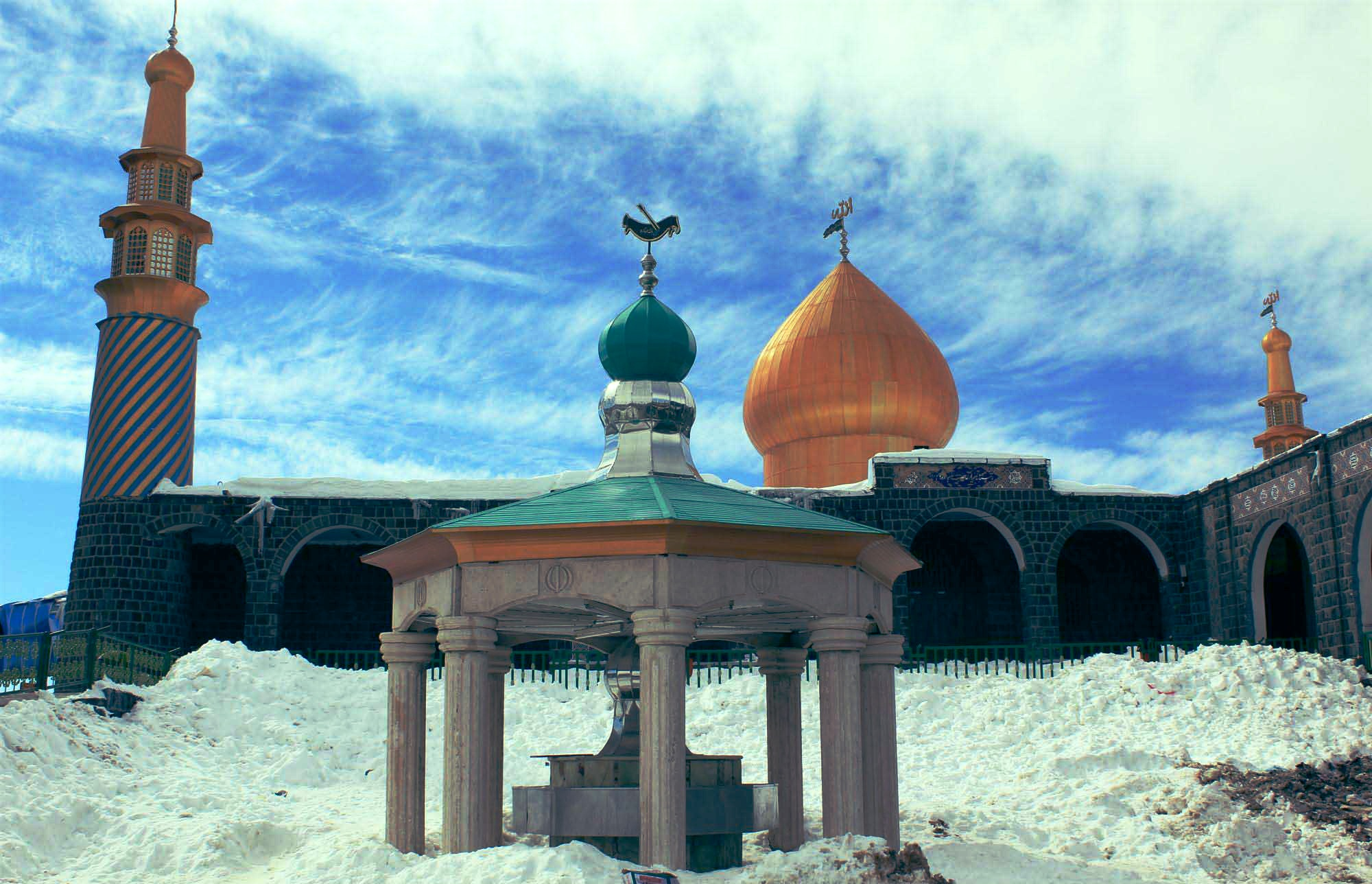
The complex partially covered in snow, in 2012

== See also ==
- List of imamzadehs in Iran
- Shia Islam in Iran
