= Michael Von Korff =

American epidemiologist and medical researcher

Michael Rehn Von Korff (born 1949) is an American epidemiologist and medical researcher who studies the treatment of chronic pain and major depressive disorder. He works as a senior investigator at Kaiser Permanente's Washington Health Research Institute in Seattle, Washington. He is the co-founder of Physicians for Responsible Opioid Prescribing, as well as a fellow of both AcademyHealth and the Society of Behavioral Medicine. He was named an ISI Highly Cited Researcher in 2002.
