= Shahandasht Waterfall =

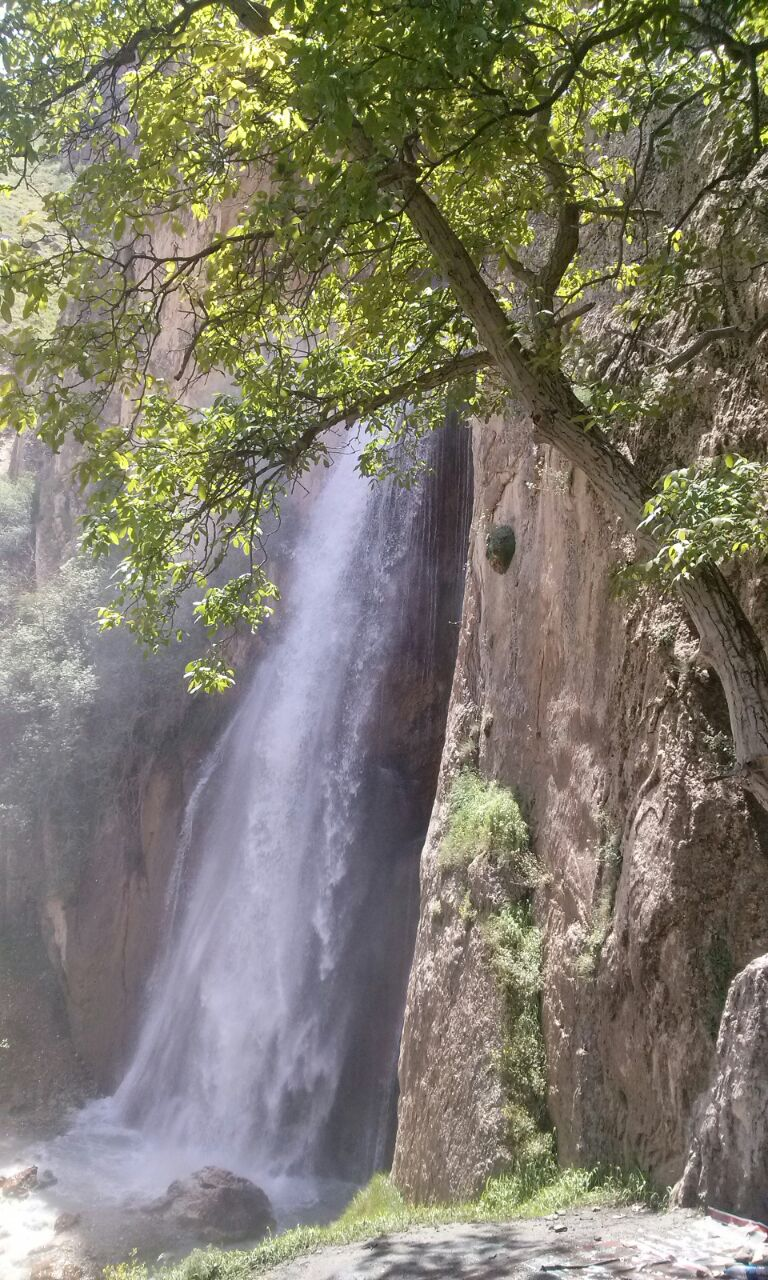
Shahandasht Waterfall

Shahandasht Waterfall is a waterfall in Amol County in Iran. The waterfall is near Shahan Dasht village, 65 kilometers south of Amol city, next to Haraz Road. It is the second-highest waterfall in Iran. The waterfall continues to run even during the cold and breezy winter. The magnificent Malek Bahman Fort is nearby.

== Sources ==
- Iran Traveller Magazine - Waterfall, Page 21, printed issue: 12433
