= Rineh =

City in Mazandaran province, Iran

Rineh Persian: رِينه
- City
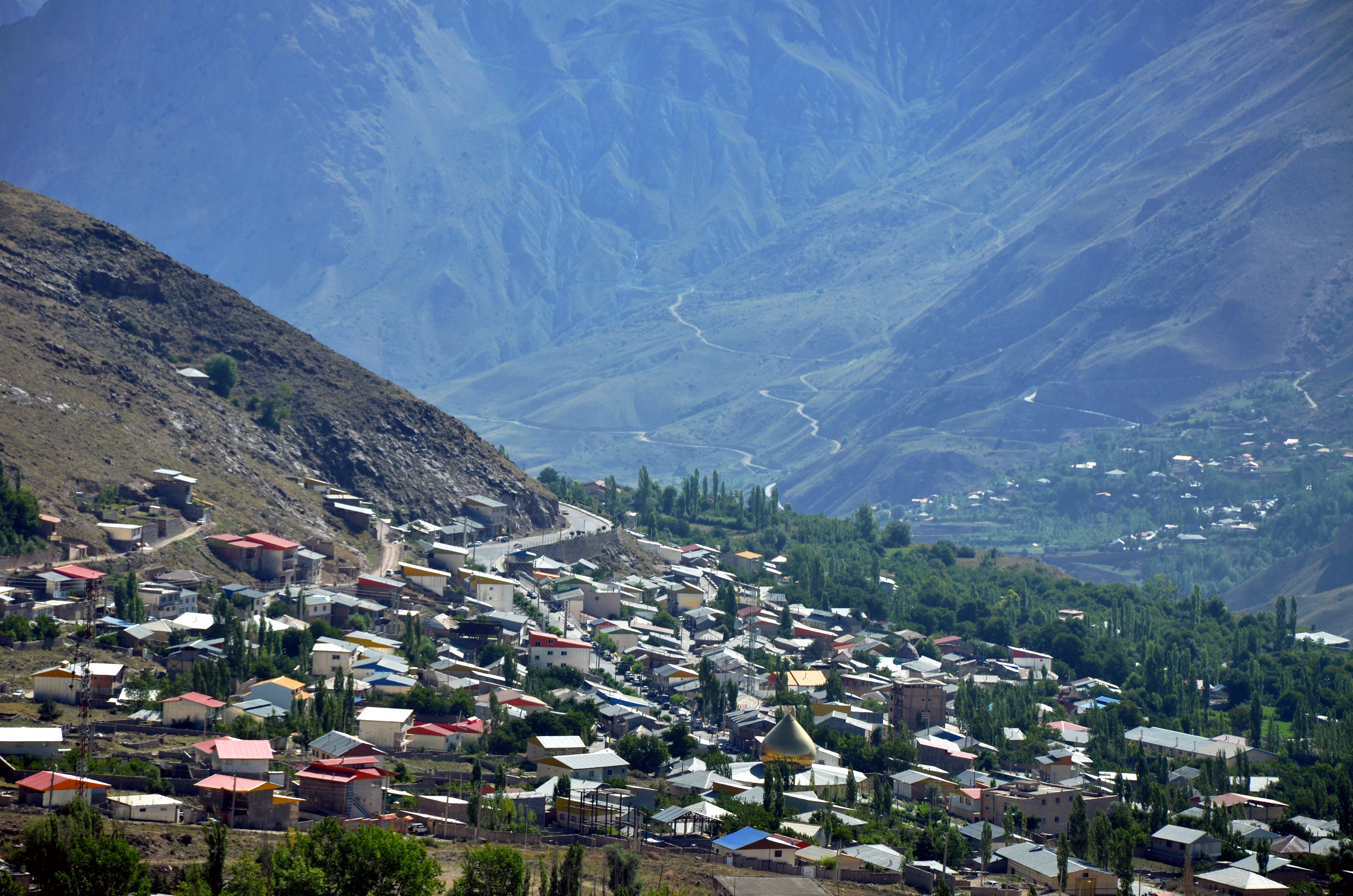
- The city of Rineh

- Location within Iran
- Coordinates: 35°52′55″N 52°10′13″E
- Country: Iran
- Province: Mazandaran
- County: Amol
- District: Larijan

Population (2016)
  - Total: 982
- Time zone: UTC+3:30 (IRST)

Rineh (Persian: رینه) (Note: Also romanized as Reyneh) is a city in Larijan District of Amol County, Mazandaran province, Iran. The city of Rineh was called Verne in ancient times. Rineh Hut is the first mountaineering resort made for Hiking Damavand Iran.

== Demographics ==
=== Population ===
At the time of the 2006 National Census, the city's population was 860 in 259 households. The following census in 2011 counted 782 people in 225 households. The 2016 census measured the population of the city as 982 people in 352 households.
