= Larijan-e Sofla Rural District =

Rural district in Mazandaran province, Iran

Larijan-e Sofla Rural District Persian: دهستان لاريجان سفلی
- Rural District
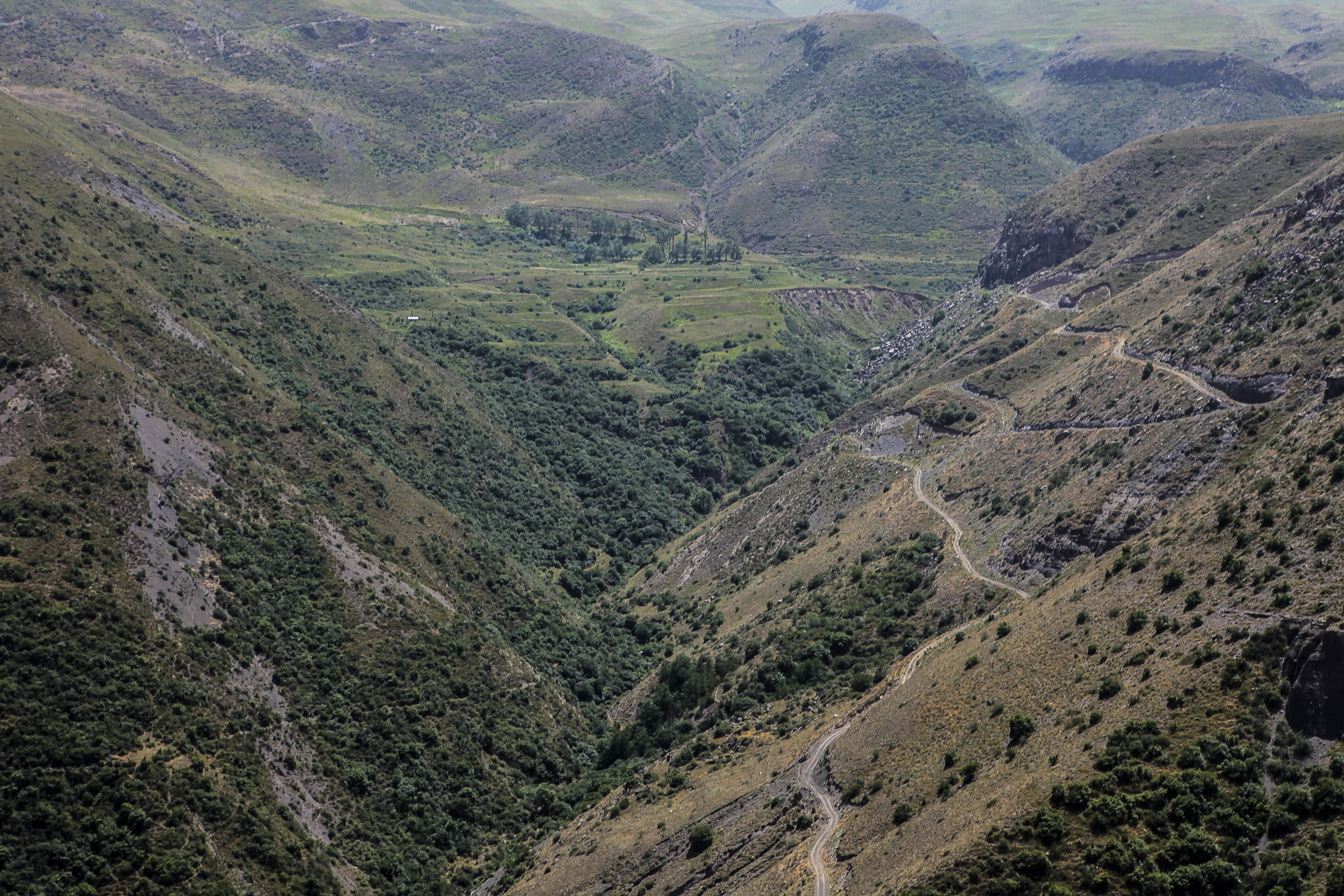
- Road to the village of Nandal

- Location within Iran
- Coordinates: 36°02′N 52°11′E
- Country: Iran
- Province: Mazandaran
- County: Amol
- District: Larijan
- Established: 1987
- Capital: Bayjan

Population (2016)
  - Total: 3,637
- Time zone: UTC+3:30 (IRST)

Larijan-e Sofla Rural District (Persian: دهستان لاريجان سفلی) is in Larijan District of Amol County, Mazandaran province, Iran. Its capital is the village of Bayjan.

== Demographics ==
=== Population ===
At the time of the 2006 National Census, the rural district's population was 2,863 in 884 households. There were 2,910 inhabitants in 1,017 households at the following census of 2011. The 2016 census measured the population of the rural district as 3,637 in 1,282 households. The most populous of its 46 villages was Nandal, with 429 people.

=== Other villages in the rural district ===
- Abd ol Manaf
- Ahan Sar
- Amreh
- Bu ol Qalam
- Darreh Kenar
- Divran
- Haft Tanan
- Hajji Dela
- Kahrud
- Keleri Kefa
- Korf
- Laher
- Lut
- Marijan
- Miandeh
- Namar
- Nesel
- Nowsar
- Panjab
- Pardameh
- Peleriyeh
- Razun
- Sheykh Mahalleh
- Sova
- Tineh
- Tiran
