= Larijan District =

District in Mazandaran province, Iran

Larijan District Persian: بخش لاریجان
- District
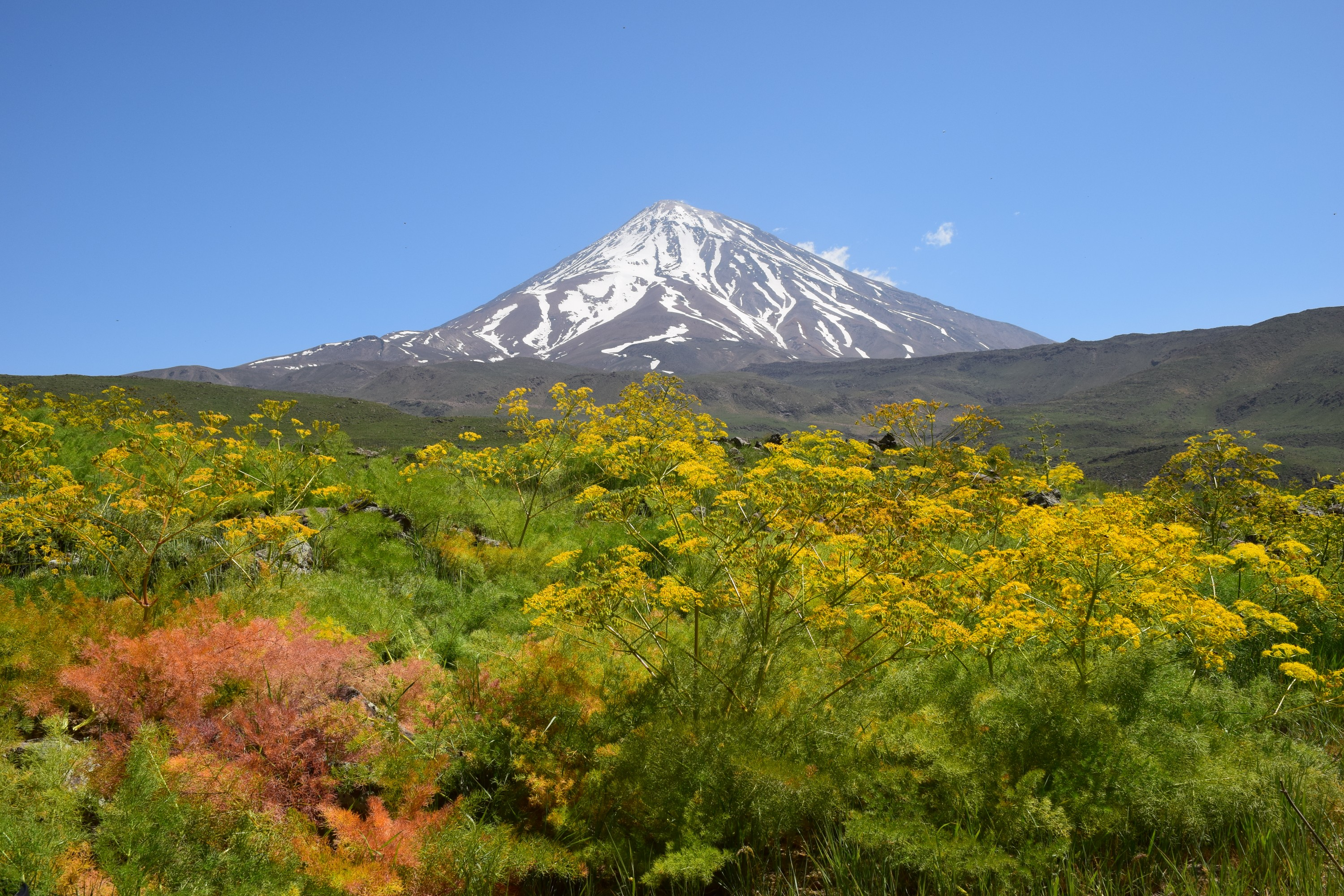
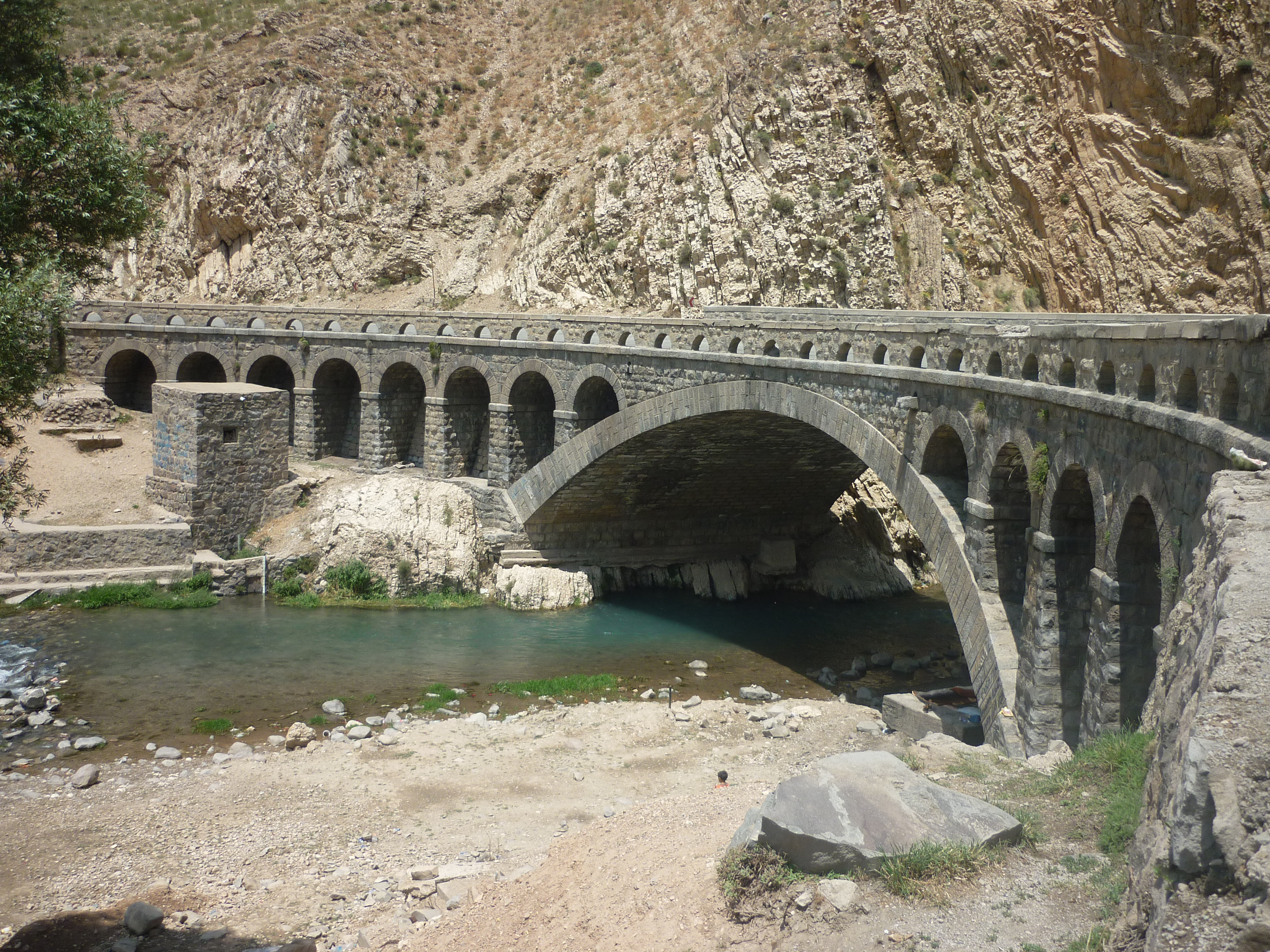
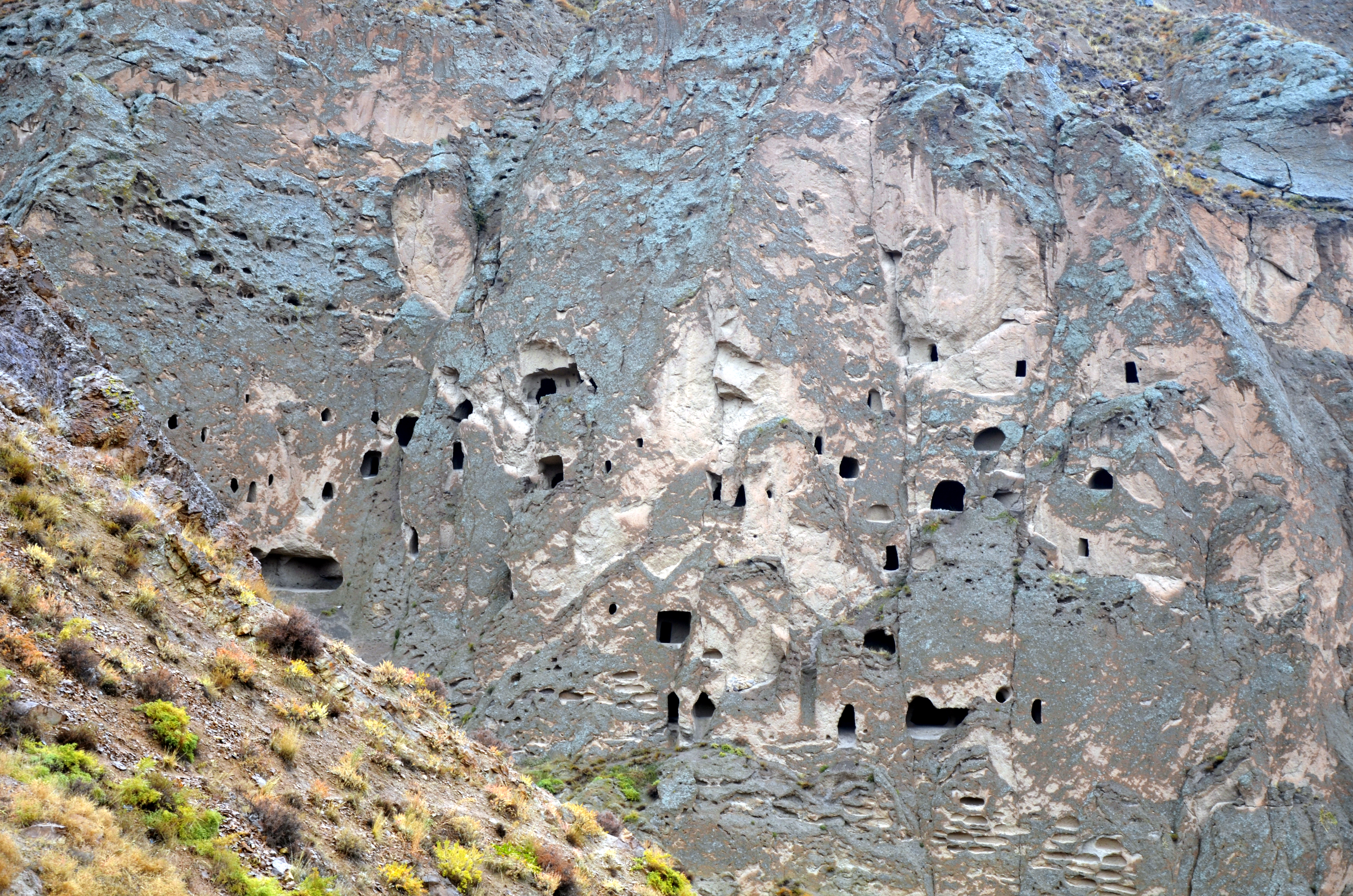
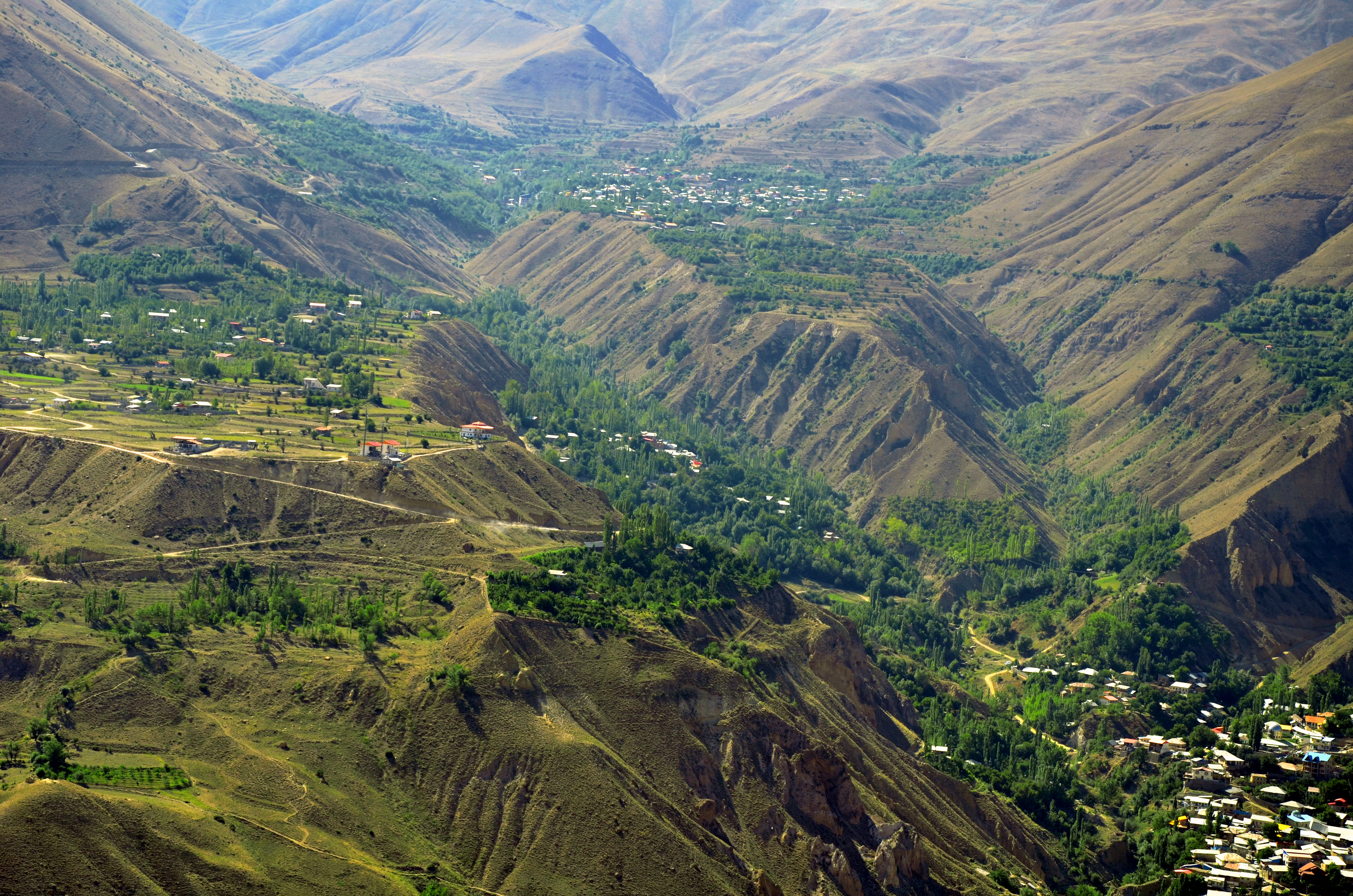
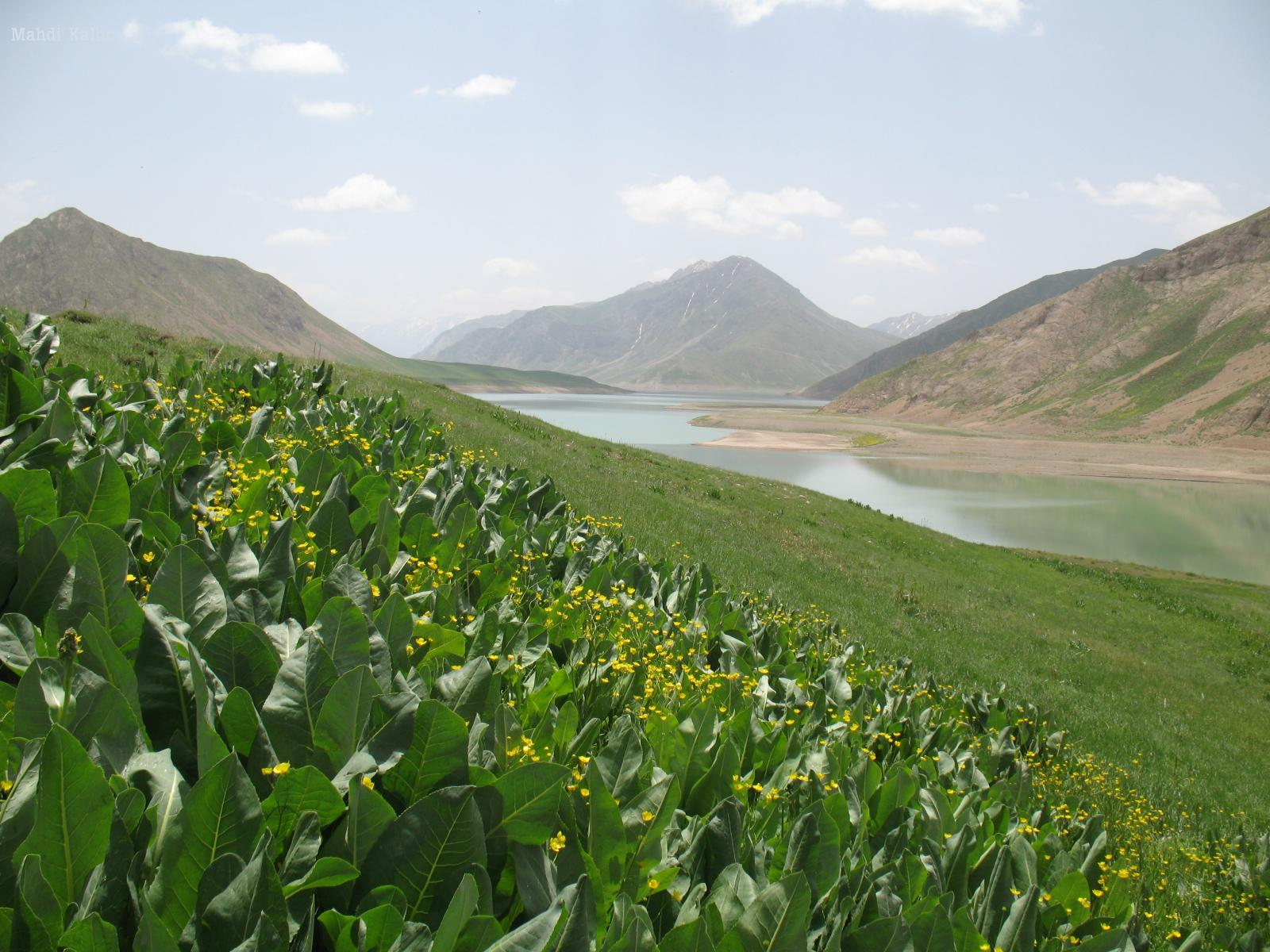
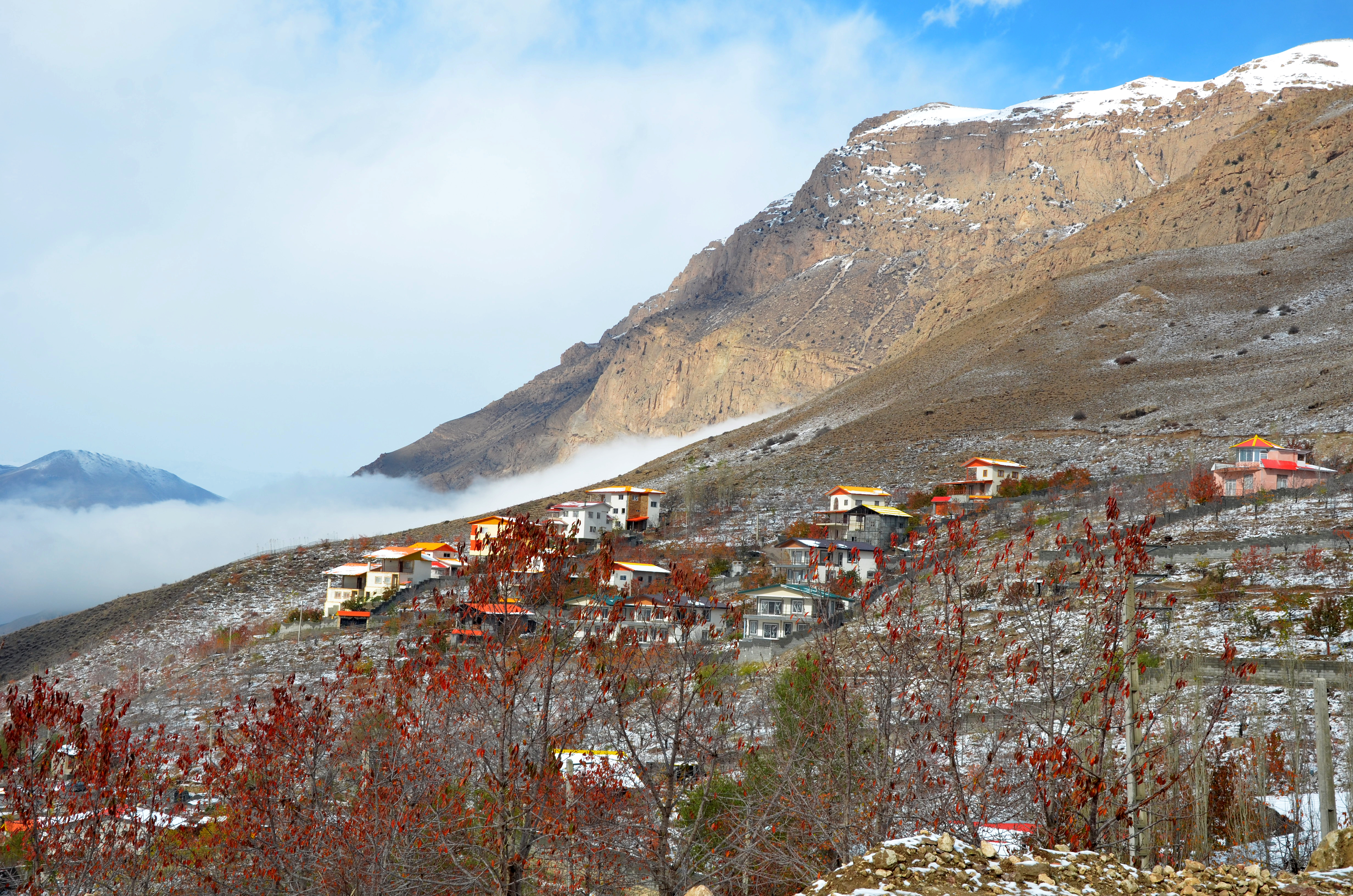
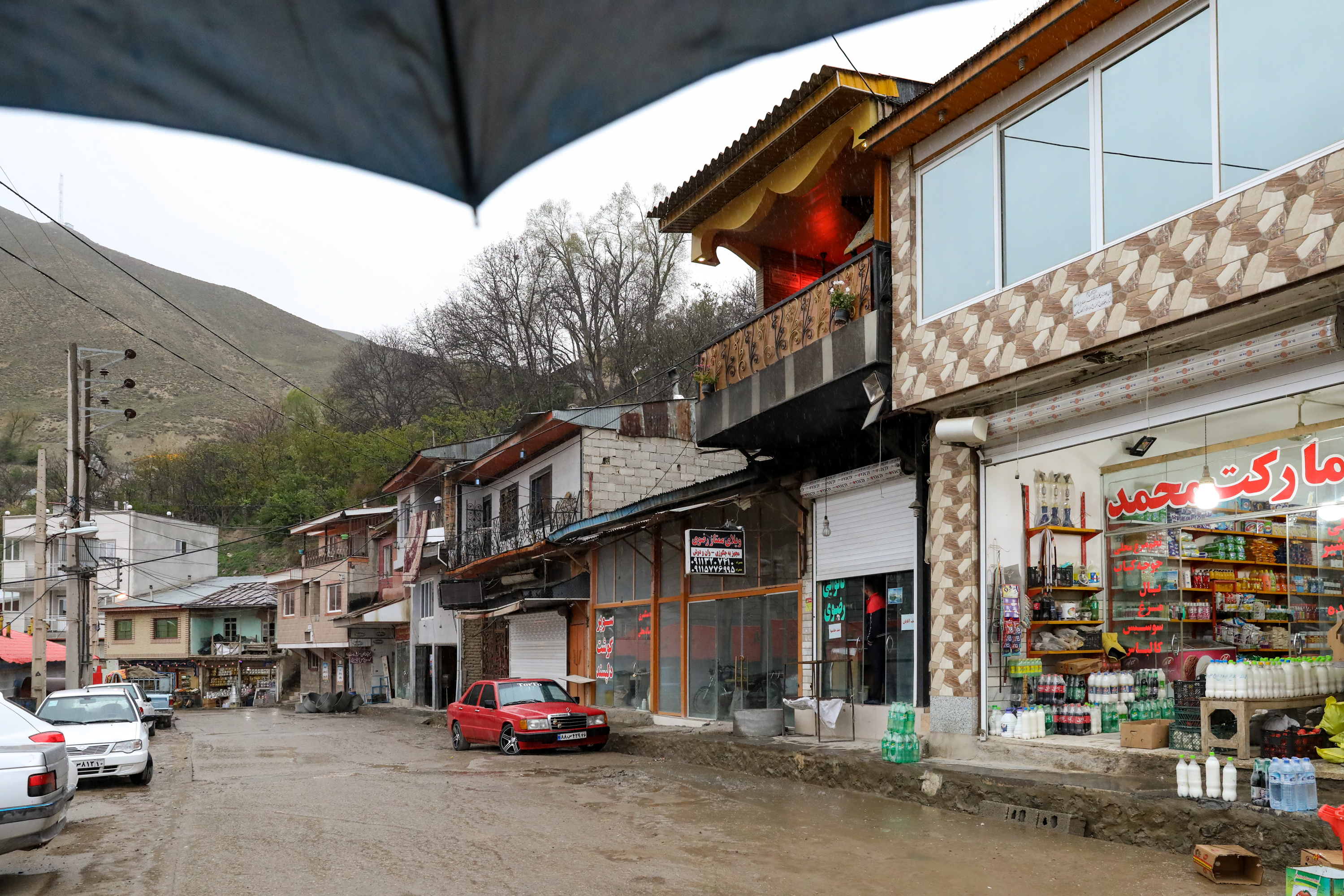

- Location within Iran
- Coordinates: 35°57′N 52°08′E
- Country: Iran
- Province: Mazandaran
- County: Amol
- Capital: Gazanak

Population (2016)
  - Total: 8,684
- Time zone: UTC+3:30 (IRST)

Larijan District (Persian: بخش لاریجان) is in Amol County, Mazandaran province, Iran. Its capital is the city of Gazanak.

== Demographics ==
=== Population ===
At the time of the 2006 National Census, the district's population was 8,089 in 2,406 households. The following census in 2011 counted 6,884 people in 2,307 households. The 2016 census measured the population of the district as 8,684 inhabitants in 3,135 households.

=== Administrative divisions ===
Larijan District Population
Administrative Divisions	2006	2011	2016
Bala Larijan RD	4,043	2,992	3,746
Larijan-e Sofla RD	2,863	2,910	3,637
Gazanak (city)	323	200	319
Rineh (city)	860	782	982
Total	8,089	6,884	8,684
RD = Rural District

== Natural attractions ==
- Haraz River
- Lar Dam
- Mount Damavand
- Shahandasht Waterfall
- Yakhi Waterfall
- Alborz (Elburz) mountain range topics
